= CCGS Henry Larsen =

Canadian Coast Guard icebreaker

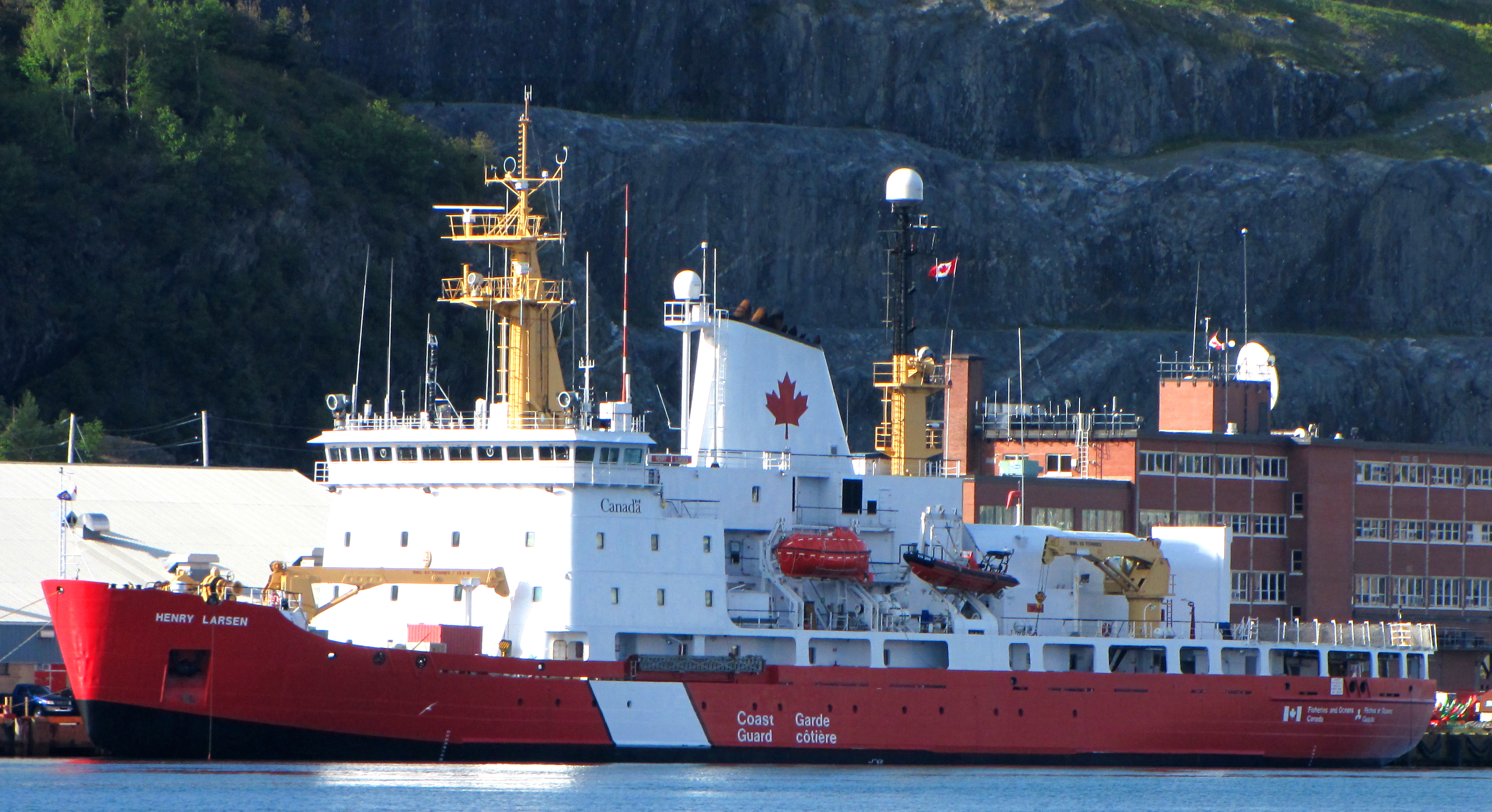
- Henry Larsen in St. John's Harbour, 2010

History

Canada
- Name: Henry Larsen
- Namesake: Henry Larsen RCMP ship captain and arctic explorer
- Operator: Canadian Coast Guard
- Port of registry: Ottawa, Ontario
- Ordered: 25 May 1984
- Builder: Versatile Pacific Shipyards, North Vancouver
- Yard number: 110
- Laid down: 23 August 1985
- Launched: 3 January 1987
- Commissioned: 29 June 1988
- In service: 1988–present
- Refit: 2000, 2015
- Home port: CCG Base St. John's (Newfoundland and Labrador Region)
- Identification: CGHL; IMO number: 8409329
- Status: in active service

General characteristics
- Class & type: Pierre Radisson-class icebreaker
- Tonnage: 6,166 GT; 1,756 NT
- Displacement: 8,290 long tons (8,420 t) full load
- Length: 99.8 m (327 ft 5 in)
- Beam: 19.6 m (64 ft 4 in)
- Draught: 7.3 m (23 ft 11 in)
- Ice class: CASPPR Arctic Class 4
- Propulsion: Diesel electric – 2 × GE AC and 3 × Wärtsilä Vasa 16V32; 12,174 kW (16,326 hp)
- Speed: 16 knots (30 km/h; 18 mph)
- Range: 20,000 nautical miles (37,000 km; 23,000 mi) at 13.5 knots (25.0 km/h; 15.5 mph)
- Endurance: 90 days
- Capacity: 40
- Complement: 31
- Sensors & processing systems: 1 × Sperry Marine Bridgemaster navigational radar
- Aircraft carried: Originally 1 × MBB Bo 105 or Bell 206L helicopter, currently 1 × Bell 429 GlobalRanger or Bell 412EPI
- Aviation facilities: Hangar and flight deck

CCGS Henry Larsen (Note: CCGS stands for Canadian Coast Guard Ship) is a Canadian Coast Guard Improved Pierre Radisson-class icebreaker serving in the Newfoundland and Labrador region and based in St John's, Newfoundland and Labrador. Entering service in 1988, Henry Larsen is the fourth ship and of an improved design over the rest of the ships in her class. The ship operates in the Arctic Ocean during summer months.

== Design ==
Classified as a Medium Gulf/River Icebreaker by the Canadian Coast Guard, Henry Larsen was ordered to a modified design from the rest of the Pierre Radisson-class icebreakers. The vessel's hull form differs from her classmates, with a differently-shaped bow with a raised forecastle and underwater "ice knife". The vessel also has a different propulsion system. Furthermore, the ship has a Wärtsilä air-bubbling system installed to allow the vessel to reduce hull friction and more easily break ice. Henry Larsen displaces 8,290 long tons (8,420 t) at full load. The vessel has a 6,166 gross tonnage (GT) and a 1,756 net tonnage (NT) making her the largest vessel in the class. The icebreaker is 99.8 metres (327 ft 5 in) long overall with a beam of 19.6 metres (64 ft 4 in) and a draught of 7.3 metres (23 ft 11 in).

The ship is propelled by two fixed-pitch propellers driven by a diesel-electric system comprising two GE AC generators and three Wärtsilä Vasa 16V32 diesel engines. Combined, the system creates 12,174 kilowatts (16,326 hp), giving the ship a maximum speed of 16 knots (30 km/h; 18 mph). The ship carries 1,650 m^{3} (360,000 imp gal) of diesel fuel, giving the ship a range of 20,000 nautical miles (37,000 km; 23,000 mi) at 13.5 knots (25.0 km/h; 15.5 mph) and can stay at sea for up to 90 days.

The icebreaker is equipped with a Sperry Marine Bridgemaster navigational radar. Henry Larsen has a flight deck and hangar which originally accommodated light helicopters of the MBB Bo 105 or Bell 206L types, but in the 2010s, the Bell 429 GlobalRanger and Bell 412EPI were acquired by the Canadian Coast Guard to replace the older helicopters. The ship can carry 22.0 m^{3} (4,800 imp gal) of aviation fuel for the helicopters. The vessel is certified as Arctic Class 4 and has a complement of 31 with 11 officers and 20 crew and 40 additional berths. The vessel is also equipped with a hospital ward.

== Service history ==
The ship was ordered on 25 May 1984 as a replacement for CCGS Labrador. Ordered as the second batch of the class, the ship was of a modified design. The vessel's keel was laid down on 23 August 1985 by Versatile Pacific Shipyards Limited at their yard in Vancouver, British Columbia with the yard number 110. The ship was launched on 3 January 1987, named after Henry Larsen, the commander of the Royal Canadian Mounted Police patrol vessel St. Roch which was the first vessel to traverse the Northwest Passage in a single season. The ship entered service with the Canadian Coast Guard on 29 June 1988.

Henry Larsen, besides icebreaking duties along Atlantic Canada, provides search and rescue support, ship escort in iced-up areas in southern Canada during the winter and in Arctic waters in the summer and supports scientific research. On the ship's maiden voyage from Victoria, British Columbia to Dartmouth, Nova Scotia, the vessel transited the Northwest Passage, performing sea trials on the trip. The ship was initially assigned to the Coast Guard base at Dartmouth, but later transferred to St. John's, Newfoundland and Labrador. In 1998, an engine room fire took the ship out of service for some time.

In 2002, the icebreaker carried Governor General Adrienne Clarkson on ceremonial duties visiting several towns in Newfoundland. A 2004 voyage by Henry Larsen was the subject of the documentary film Ice Breaker. In 2008 Discovery Channel filmed an episode of Mighty Ships aboard Henry Larsen as the ship did an ice patrol around Notre Dame Bay in Newfoundland.

In September 2009 Henry Larsen participated in a training exercise with the Danish vessels HDMS Ejnar Mikkelsen and HDMS Hvidbjørnen.

In September 2013, Henry Larsen was sent to aid sister ship CCGS Amundsen in recovering a MBB Bo 155 helicopter that had deployed from Amundsen and crashed near Banks Island killing three crew members including Amundsen's master. The helicopter had sunk in 420 metres (1,380 ft) of water and Henry Larsen assisted Amundsen in keeping the ice clear while Amundsen brought the helicopter wreckage back to the surface. In August 2014, Henry Larsen took part in Operation Nanook, a joint military exercise that took place in the Davis Strait. On 7 July 2015, it was announced that Henry Larsen would undergo a $16 million refit at Davie Yards Incorporated in Lauzon, Quebec. In April 2017, Henry Larsen was dispatched to aid the ferry MV Apollo which had become stuck in ice in the Strait of Belle Isle near Blanc-Sablon, Quebec for over 24 hours. The icebreaker escorted the ferry to port once she was free of the ice.
