= CCGS Des Groseilliers =

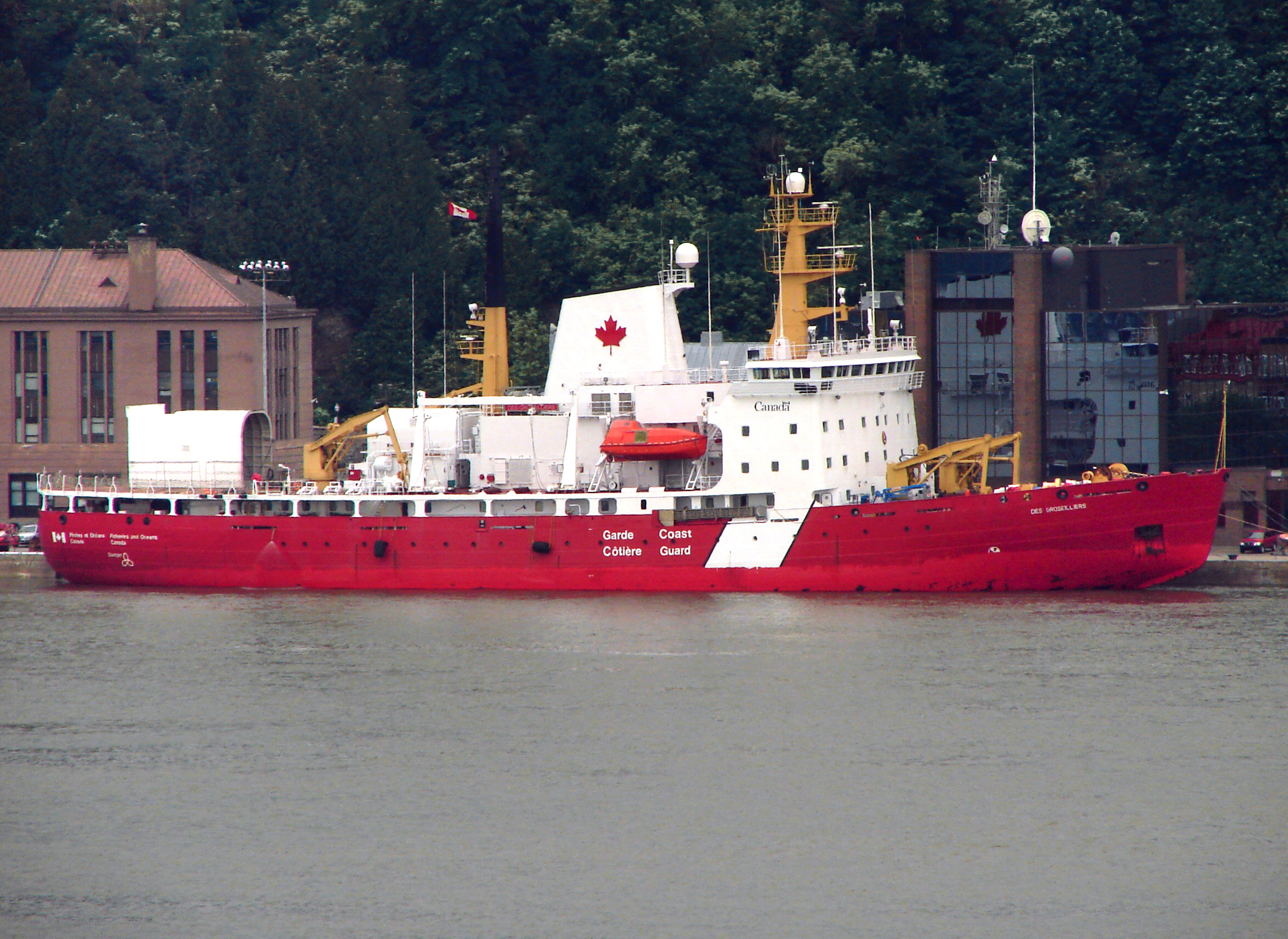
- Des Groseilliers in 2006

History

Canada
- Name: Des Groseilliers
- Namesake: Médard des Groseilliers
- Operator: Canadian Coast Guard
- Port of registry: Ottawa, Ontario
- Builder: Port Weller Dry Docks Limited, St. Catharines, Ontario
- Yard number: 802160
- Launched: 20 February 1982
- Completed: October 1982
- Commissioned: August 1982
- In service: 1982–present
- Refit: 1996
- Home port: CCG Base Quebec City (Quebec Region)
- Identification: IMO number: 8006385; MMSI number: 316072000; Callsign: CGDX
- Status: in active service

General characteristics
- Class & type: Pierre Radisson-class icebreaker
- Tonnage: 6,097.8 GT; 1,799.9 NT
- Displacement: 6,400 long tons (6,500 t)
- Length: 98.24 m (322 ft 4 in)
- Beam: 19.84 m (65 ft 1 in)
- Draught: 7.44 m (24 ft 5 in)
- Ice class: CASPPR Arctic Class 3
- Propulsion: Diesel electric – 6 Bombardier M251F-16v9
- Speed: 16.5 knots (30.6 km/h)
- Range: 30,600 nmi (56,700 km)
- Endurance: 108 days
- Complement: 38 (12 officers, 26 crew)
- Sensors & processing systems: 1 × Sperry navigational radar
- Aircraft carried: originally 1 × MBB Bo 105 or Bell 206L helicopter, currently 1 × Bell 429 Global Ranger or 1 × Bell 412EPI
- Aviation facilities: Hangar and flight deck

CCGS Des Groseilliers (Note: CCGS stands for Canadian Coast Guard Ship) is a Pierre Radisson-class icebreaker in the Canadian Coast Guard. The vessel is named after Médard Chouart des Groseilliers (1618–1669) a close associate of Pierre-Esprit Radisson in explorations west of the Great Lakes and the founding of the British Hudson's Bay Company. The ship entered service in 1982. The vessel has participated in a number of research voyages, including Ice Station SHEBA. As part of the Surface Heat Budget of the Arctic Ocean experiment conducted in the Arctic Ocean from October 1997 to October 1998 to provide polar input to global climate models, Des Groseilliers was allowed to be frozen into the ice for the Arctic winter, to serve as a base for scientific researchers.

== Design and description ==
The Pierre Radisson class were designed for Coast Guard operations in the Arctic Ocean. Des Groseilliers has a standard displacement of 6,400 long tons (6,500 t) and 7,594 long tons (7,716 t) fully loaded. The vessel has a 6,097.8 GT and a 1,799.9 NT. The ship is 98.2 metres (322 ft 2 in) long overall with a beam of 19.5 metres (64 ft 0 in) and a draught of 7.4 metres (24 ft 3 in).

The vessel is propelled by two fixed-pitch propellers and one bow thruster powered by a diesel-electric system comprising six Alco M251F diesel engines that when driving the shafts create 17,580 shaft horsepower (13,110 kW) and six GEC generators creating 11.1 megawatts sustained, powering two motors that when driving the shafts create 13,600 shp (10,100 kW). The vessel is also equipped with one Caterpillar 398 emergency generator. This gives the vessel a maximum speed of 16 knots (30 km/h). The vessel can carry 2,464 m^{3} (542,000 imp gal) of diesel fuel and has a range of 30,600 nautical miles (56,700 km) at 12 knots (22 km/h) and can stay at sea for up to 108 days.

Des Groseilliers is equipped with a Sperry navigational radar operating on the E/F and I bands. The icebreaker has a 187 m^{2} (2,010 sq ft) flight deck and a 88.5 m^{2} (953 sq ft) hangar which originally accommodated one light helicopter of the MBB Bo 105 or Bell 206L types, but currently accommodates the Bell 429 GlobalRanger and Bell 412EPI which were acquired by the Canadian Coast Guard in the 2010s to replace the older helicopters. The ship can carry 25.6 m^{3} (5,600 imp gal) of aviation fuel for the helicopters. The vessel is certified as Arctic Class 3 and has a complement of 35 with 10 officers and 25 crew and 40 additional berths.

== Operational history ==
The third vessel in the class, Des Groseilliers was ordered in December 1979 as part of the Canadian government's efforts to stimulate shipbuilding in Canada. The ship was constructed by Port Weller Dry Docks at their shipyard in Port Weller, Ontario with the yard number 68 and was launched on 20 February 1982. The vessel was commissioned in August 1982 and completed in October. The ship replaced the aging icebreaker CCGS D'Iberville in the Laurentian Region. The vessel is registered in Ottawa, Ontario and homeported at Quebec City, Quebec. During the winter, Des Groseilliers is assigned to icebreaking and ship escort operations in the Gulf of St. Lawrence and on the St. Lawrence and Saguenay Rivers and supports icebreaking operations in the Saint Lawrence Seaway and Great Lakes. During the summer the icebreaker sails to the Canadian Arctic to escort commercial vessels, maintain navigation aids in the region, search and rescue, and support scientific missions.

In 1983, Des Groseilliers made her first voyage to the Arctic. In April 1984, after the opening of the navigation season on the Saint Lawrence Seaway and the Great Lakes, the area froze up, driving six cargo ships ashore and a further eighteen became stuck in the ice. Five icebreakers were assigned to aid the merchant vessels, however, they proved unable to meet the task. Des Groseilliers and CCGS Griffon were sent to their aid, with Des Groseilliers arriving on 11 April and worked to free the stuck vessels and provide safe passage until 29 April. The following year, the icebreaker escorted the icebreaking cargo ship Arctic to Cameron Island in the Arctic to load 100,000 barrels of oil.

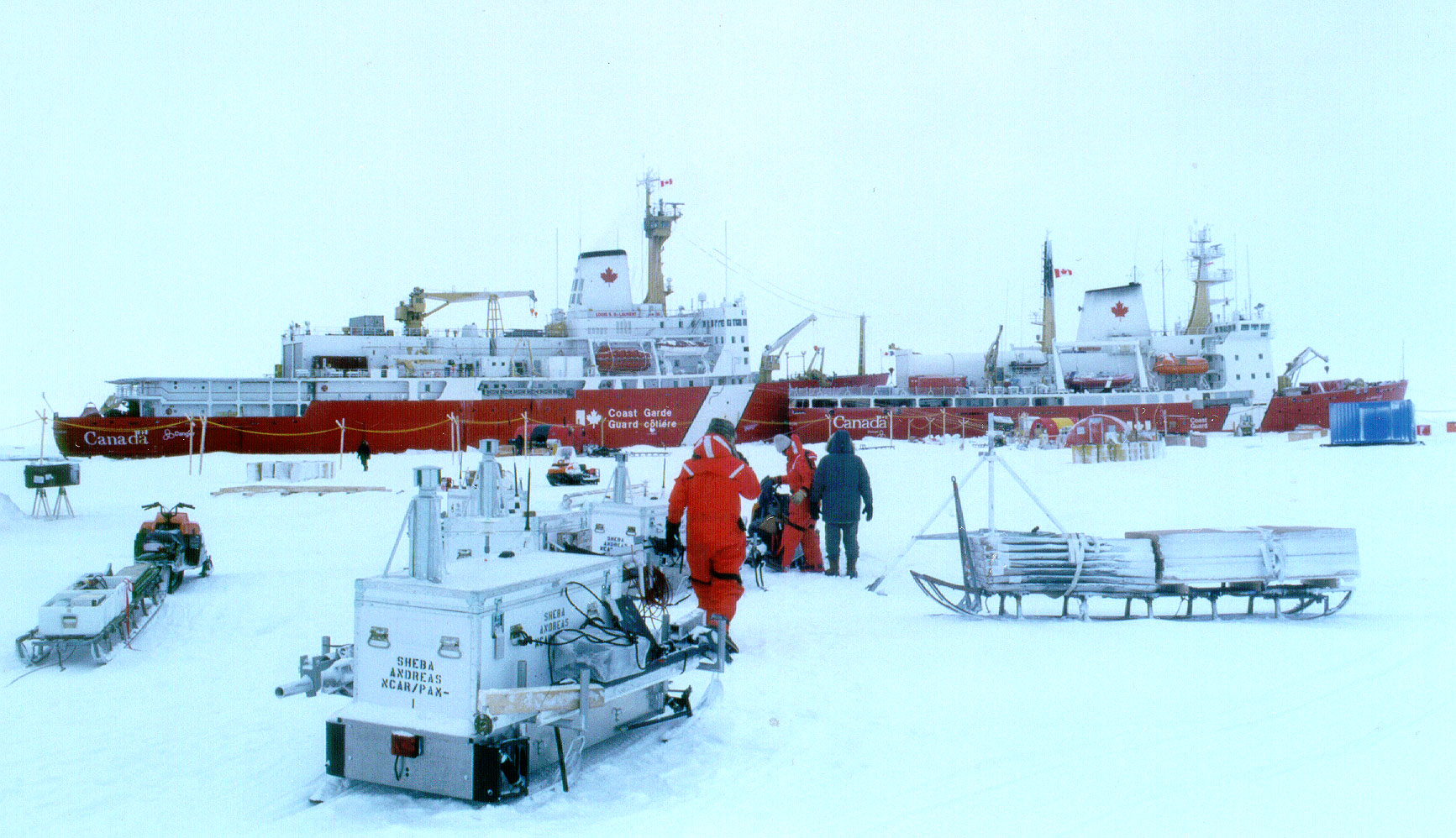
Ice station SHEBA base, Des Groseilliers (right) with Louis S. St-Laurent

As part of the Surface Heat Budget of the Arctic Ocean experiment in 1997, CCGS Louis S. St-Laurent and Des Groseilliers sailed through the Northwest Passage to meet CCGS Sir Wilfrid Laurier in Alaskan waters. Sir Wilfrid Laurier then escorted Des Groseilliers to a point where Des Groseilliers's engines were shut off on 2 October and the ship was left with a minimum crew and a group of international scientists. The vessel was then left to drift in the pack ice for a year and dubbed Ice Station SHEBA. Landing strips were constructed on the ice and throughout the winter the vessel was visited by Twin Otter aircraft bringing equipment and replacement personnel and scientists. In Spring 1998, the ice that enclosed the ship began to crack and the landing strips could no longer be used. The icebreaker had been expected to drift in circles, however, the vessel drifted towards Russian waters. During the summer, the vessel was supported by helicopters from the United States Coast Guard vessels Polar Sea and Polar Star. Louis S. St-Laurent returned on 9 October 1998 with additional crew and the two vessels sailed south, with Des Groseilliers returning to Quebec City on 4 November.

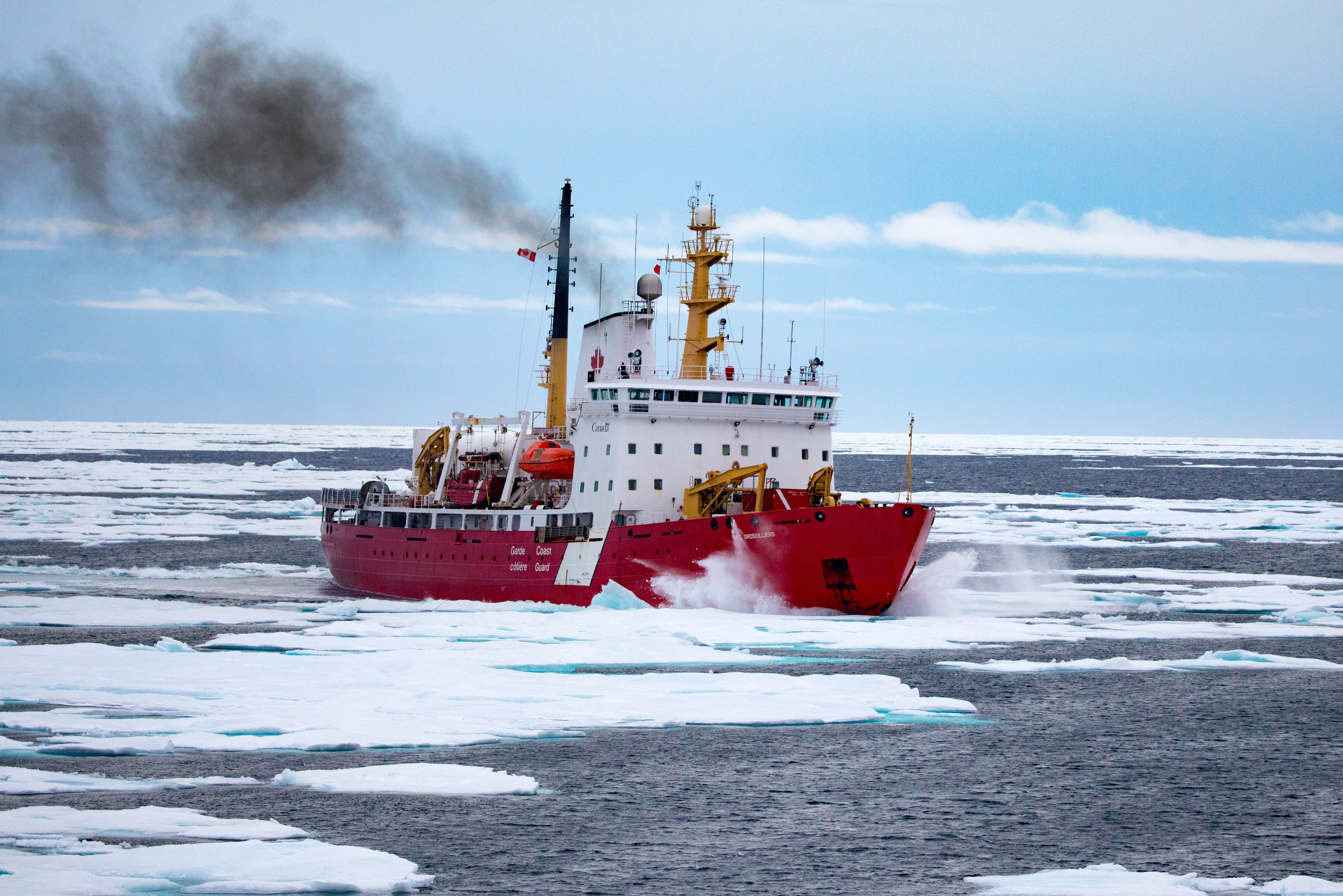
Des Groseilliers breaking ice in Franklin Strait, Nunavut

In spring 2008, Des Groseilliers collided with the Sea Shepherd Conservation Society vessel, Farley Mowat, in the Gulf of Saint Lawrence, during the annual seal hunt. Paul Watson, head of the society, claimed that the icebreaker had rammed the society's research vessel. However, a spokesman for the department of Fisheries and Oceans Canada claimed that the research vessel "grazed" the icebreaker.

In January 2019, Des Groseillers and CCGS Pierre Radisson were both deployed to the Saint Lawrence River after large ice jams closed the shipping lane, trapping merchant vessels in Montreal and Trois-Rivières, Quebec.
