= CCGS Amundsen =

Icebreaker of the Canadian Coast Guard

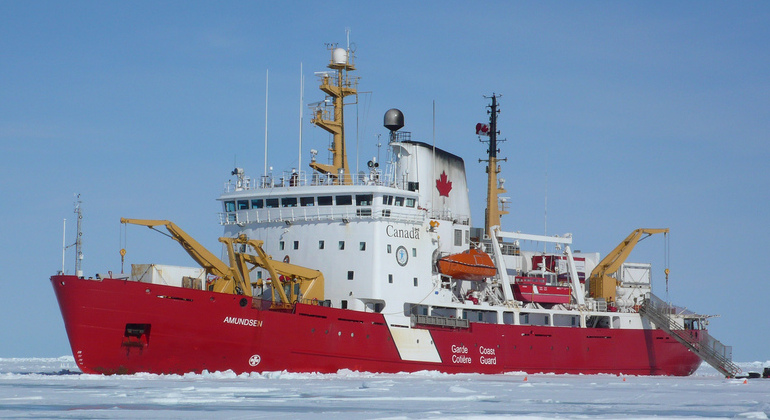
- The icebreaker and Arctic Ocean research vessel CCGS Amundsen

History

Canada
- Name: Franklin; Sir John Franklin; Amundsen
- Namesake: Sir John Franklin (1979–2003); Roald Amundsen (since 2003)
- Owner: Government of Canada
- Operator: Canadian Coast Guard
- Port of registry: Ottawa, Ontario
- Builder: Burrard Dry Dock Co. Ltd., North Vancouver
- Yard number: 222
- Laid down: 4 January 1977
- Launched: 10 March 1978
- Sponsored by: Lily Schreyer
- Commissioned: March 1979 (as CCGS Franklin)
- Decommissioned: 2000
- Recommissioned: 2003 (as CCGS Amundsen)
- In service: 1979–present
- Out of service: 2011–2012
- Renamed: 1980 (as CCGS Sir John Franklin); 2003 (as CCGS Amundsen)
- Refit: 2003; 2011–2012
- Home port: CCG Base Quebec City (Quebec Region)
- Identification: CGDT; IMO number: 7510846
- Status: in active service

General characteristics
- Class & type: Pierre Radisson-class icebreaker and Arctic research vessel
- Tonnage: 5,911 GT; 1,678 NT
- Displacement: 6,400 long tons (6,500 t) standard; 8,180 long tons (8,310 t) fully loaded
- Length: 98.2 m (322 ft 2 in)
- Beam: 19.5 m (64 ft 0 in)
- Draught: 7.2 m (23 ft 7 in)
- Ice class: CASPPR Arctic Class 3
- Installed power: 6 × Bombardier M251F-16v9, 13,200 kW (17,700 hp)
- Propulsion: Diesel-electric; two shafts
- Speed: 16 knots (30 km/h; 18 mph)
- Range: 35,000 nautical miles (65,000 km; 40,000 mi) at 14 knots (26 km/h; 16 mph)
- Endurance: 100 days
- Capacity: 51
- Complement: 31
- Aircraft carried: Originally 1 × MBB Bo 105 or Bell 206L helicopter, currently 1 × Bell 429 GlobalRanger or Bell 412EPI
- Aviation facilities: Hangar and flight deck

CCGS Amundsen (Note: CCGS stands for Canadian Coast Guard Ship) is a Pierre Radisson-class icebreaker and Arctic research vessel operated by the Canadian Coast Guard. The vessel entered service in 1979 as Franklin and was renamed Sir John Franklin in 1980 and served as such until 1996. Declared surplus, the vessel was used as an accommodation ship in Labrador in 1996 and placed in reserve in 2000. In 2003, the ship was reactivated and underwent conversion to an Arctic research vessel. The ship recommissioned as Amundsen.

== Design and description ==
The Pierre Radisson class were designed for Coast Guard operations in the Arctic Ocean. Amundsen has a standard displacement of 6,400 long tons (6,500 t) and is 8,180 long tons (8,310 t) fully loaded. The vessel has a gross tonnage of 5,911 and a net tonnage of 1,678. The ship is 98.3 metres (322 ft 6 in) long overall with a beam of 19.5 metres (64 ft 0 in) and a draught of 7.2 metres (23 ft 7 in).

The vessel is propelled by two fixed-pitch propellers and one bow thruster powered by a diesel-electric system comprising six Alco M251F diesel engines that when driving the shafts create 13,200 kilowatts (17,700 hp) and six GEC generators creating 11.1 megawatts sustained powering two motors that when driving the shafts create 13,600 hp (10,100 kW). Amundsen is also equipped with one Caterpillar 398 emergency generator. This gives the vessel a maximum speed of 16 knots (30 km/h). The vessel can carry 2,471 m^{3} (544,000 imp gal) of diesel fuel and has a range of 35,000 nautical miles (65,000 km) at 14 knots (26 km/h) and can stay at sea for up to 100 days.

Amundsen is equipped with a Sperry navigational radar operating on the E/F and I bands. The icebreaker has a flight deck and hangar which originally accommodated a MBB Bo 105 or Bell 206L light helicopter, but currently supports the Bell 429 GlobalRanger and Bell 412EPI which were acquired by the Canadian Coast Guard in the 2010s to replace the older helicopters. The vessel is certified as Arctic Class 3 and has a complement of 31 with 11 officers and 20 crew. Amundsen has an additional 51 berths.

== Operational history ==
The ship's keel was laid down 4 January 1977 by Burrard Dry Dock at their yard in North Vancouver, British Columbia with the yard number 222. The ship was launched on 10 March 1978 and entered in Coast Guard service in March 1979. The ship was named Franklin in honour of Arctic explorer Sir John Franklin. After completing the vessel performed sea trials in the western Arctic and Northwest Passage. While transiting the Northwest Passage, heading to the icebreaker's assigned base in Newfoundland, Franklin lost a propeller in Viscount Melville Sound and was rescued by CCGS Louis S. St-Laurent and returned to the west coast. The two ships then transited to the East Coast of Canada via the Panama Canal. In 1980, the vessel was renamed to Sir John Franklin at the request of the crew. The ship worked out of CCG Base Dartmouth and CCG Base Quebec City for most of the 1980s and 1990s, being tasked to winter icebreaking operations in the Gulf of St. Lawrence and St. Lawrence River and off Newfoundland. During the summer season, Sir John Franklin was often tasked to support the annual Arctic Summer Sealift operation for escorting cargo ships to remote port communities in the Canadian Arctic Archipelago.

In 1981, Sir John Franklin was used to test Coast Guard procedures in the oil spill exercise called "Baffin Island Oil Spill". In 1987, the ship escorted the Arctic cargo ship/oil tanker MV Arctic to Nanisivik. In July 1989, the icebreaker again attempted to transit the Northwest Passage but was forced to break off the attempt after ice conditions were found to be too severe. In June 1994, at the height of the Turbot War, Sir John Franklin was among the Coast Guard vessels sent to monitor the European fishing fleets on the Grand Banks. The ship was kept just out of sight but within radar range of foreign fishing trawlers. These actions led to the detainment and seizure of the Spanish fishing trawler Estai.

=== Decommissioning ===
Following the 1995 transfer of the Canadian Coast Guard from the Department of Transport to the Department of Fisheries and Oceans, Sir John Franklin was deemed surplus to the fleet in 1996. That summer, she was contracted to Newfoundland-based shipping company Canship for use as an accommodations vessel during exploration work at a coastal nickel deposit at Voisey's Bay in northern Labrador. She was subsequently decommissioned from the Canadian Coast Guard in 2000 and placed in non-operational reserve.

=== Conversion to Arctic research vessel ===
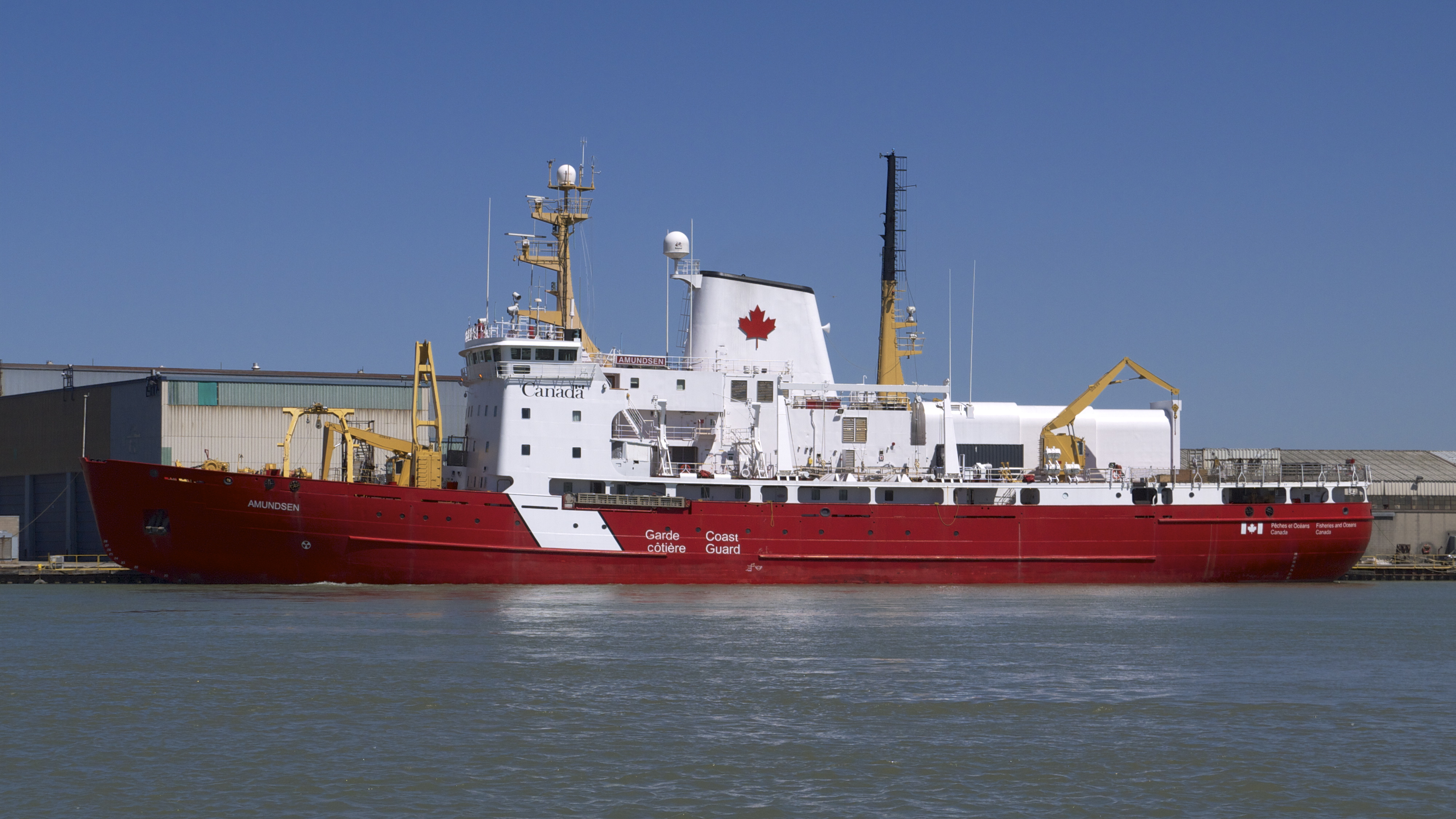
Amundsen in May 2013, finishing refit at Port Weller, Ontario

In 2001, the Canadian Coast Guard announced that it could not provide an icebreaker for research purposes in the Arctic that year. This led to several scientific groups looking for a possible replacement. In 2002, a consortium of Canadian universities and federal departments submitted a proposal to convert Sir John Franklin into an Arctic Ocean research vessel. The proposal was accepted and the ship given new life in August 2003 after funding was received for the new dedicated research vessel. The total cost for the refit was CAN$30.7 million with $27.7 million provided by the Canadian Foundation for Innovation and $3 million provided by the Department of Fisheries and Oceans.

The ship was towed from St. John's, Newfoundland and Labrador and underwent the 10-month conversion of Sir John Franklin at a shipyard in Les Mechins, Quebec. There, part of the vessel's storage holds were transformed into laboratory space. The refit included the addition of a moon pool, which enables scientists to lower scientific instruments from inside the hull without cutting a hole in the ice, multi-beam sonar, the replacement of heating and electrical systems, and installation of state-of-the-art scientific equipment. The vessel was recommissioned into the Canadian Coast Guard as Amundsen, named in honour of Arctic explorer Roald Amundsen, on 26 August 2003. Amundsen's sponsor was Lily Schreyer, the sponsor of Franklin when the vessel first entered service. The ship remained the property of the Canadian Coast Guard and continues to support Coast Guard functions but is the dedicated science platform for scientists in the Arctic.

=== Return to service ===
Shortly after re-entering service, Amundsen began its career as a research vessel, departing for Prince William Sound. The ship remained in the Arctic for 398 days, split over two missions, an expedition to the Beaufort Sea and the other in support of Inuit communities in Nunavik. In 2004, Amundsen became the first Canadian vessel to offer hospital services to the Aboriginal peoples living in remote locations in Canada's north since the controversial CCGS C.D. Howe was taken out of service in 1970. The ship supports ArcticNet's marine-based research program. In July 2007, Amundsen departed for a 15-month expedition to the Canadian Arctic to work on several projects. In 2009, the ship was sent to collect new environmental data in the Beaufort Sea in co-operation with the oil exploitation sector. In August 2010, Amundsen responded to 27 August grounding of the cruise liner Clipper Adventurer in the Coronation Gulf. Arriving on 29 August, the icebreaker took off the 120 passengers and crew and brought them to Kugluktuk, arriving on 30 August.

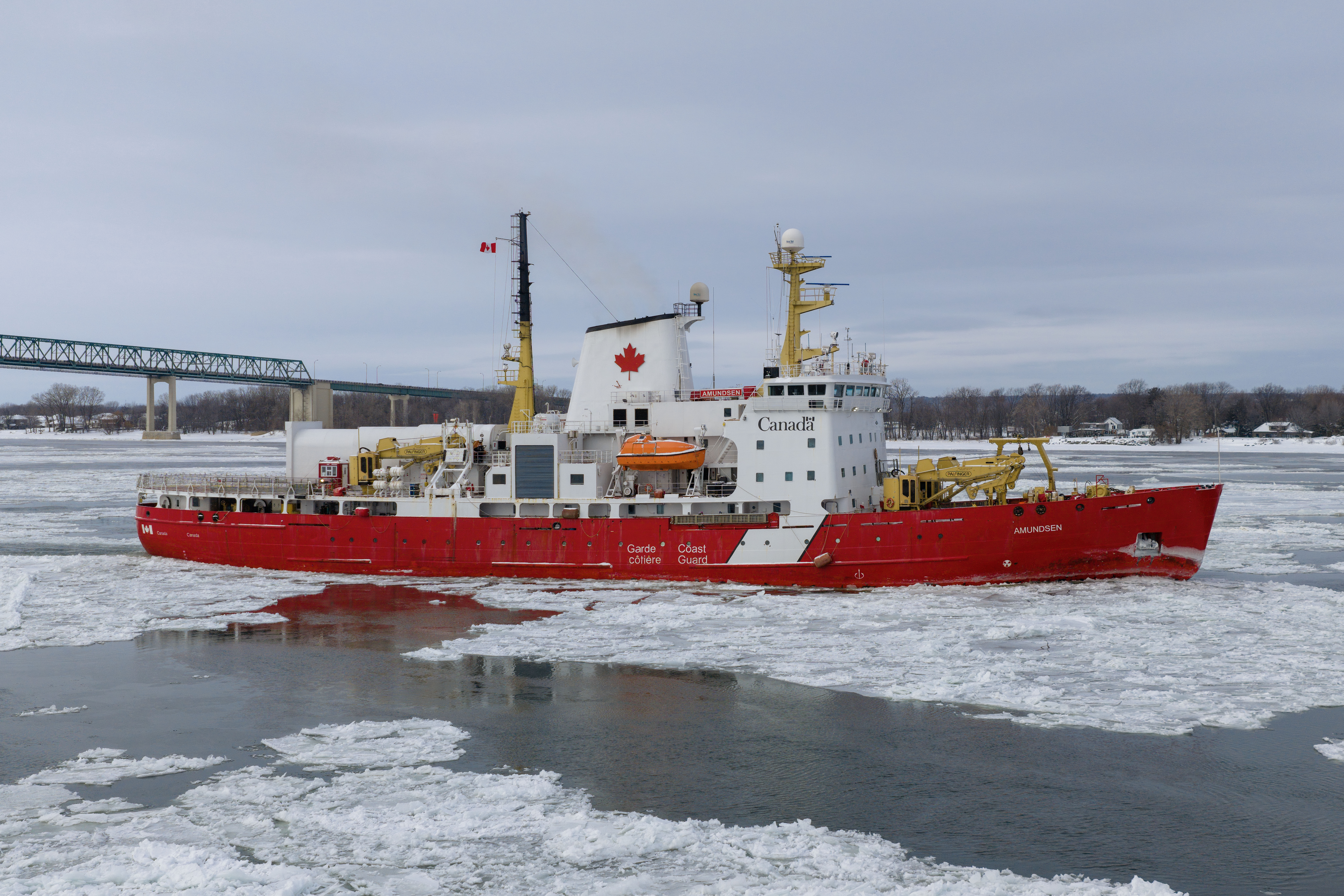
Amundsen breaking ice at Trois-Rivières, Quebec in 2026

In 2011, it was announced that an image of the vessel would be placed on the backside of the new Canadian 50 Dollar polymer banknote. This was intended to mark Canada's northern frontier and arctic research. In December 2011 a routine maintenance inspection discovered dangerous cracking in four of her six engines. The engines required immediate replacement, and she was unavailable throughout 2012. Amundsen departed on 26 July 2013 for deployment in the Arctic.

The helicopter attached to Amundsen crashed in the Arctic on 9 September 2013, with a loss of three lives, including the commander, the helicopter pilot and an academic from the University of Manitoba. In July 2015, Amundsen was redirected from a 115-day science cruise to northern Baffin Bay to aid resupply ships for northern communities which were navigating heavy ice in Hudson Bay.

On 24 August 2018, Amundsen was directed to assist Akademik Ioffe, a research vessel that had run aground in the western Gulf of Boothia. Once on the scene, Amundsen and her helicopter were used to transfer passengers from the research vessel to Akademik Ioffe's sister ship Akademik Sergey Vavilov.
