= Pierre Radisson-class icebreaker =

Arctic Ocean Icebreakers (Summer)

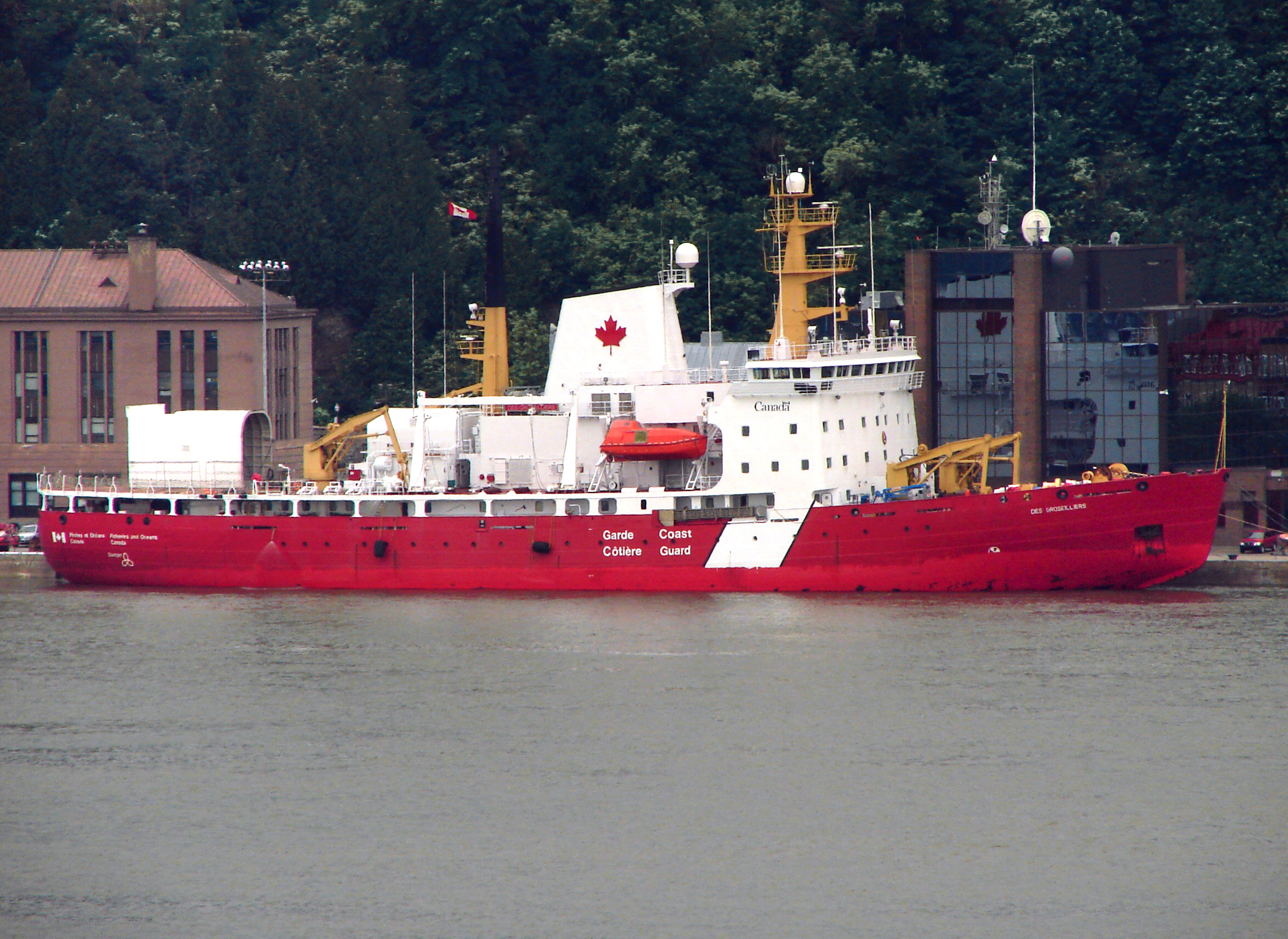
- Des Groseilliers in 2006

Class overview
- Name: Pierre Radisson or R class
- Builders: Various
- Operators: Canadian Coast Guard
- Subclasses: Improved R class
- Built: 1976–1988
- In service: 1977–present
- Completed: 4
- Active: 4

General characteristics for Pierre Radisson as built
- Type: Medium icebreaker (CCG)
- Tonnage: 5,910 GRT; 1,678 NT
- Displacement: 6,400 long tons (6,500 t) standard; 8,180 long tons (8,310 t) fully loaded
- Length: 98.3 m (322 ft 6 in)
- Beam: 19.5 m (64 ft 0 in)
- Draught: 7.2 m (23 ft 7 in)
- Ice class: Arctic Class 3
- Installed power: Diesel-electric: 6 × Alco M251F, 17,580 shp (13,110 kW); 6 GEC generators, 2 motors 13,600 shp (10,100 kW)
- Propulsion: 2 shafts, bow thruster
- Speed: 16 knots (30 km/h)
- Range: 15,000 nmi (28,000 km) at 13.5 knots (25.0 km/h)
- Endurance: 120 days
- Complement: 38
- Aircraft carried: 1 × MBB Bo 105 or Bell 206L helicopter
- Aviation facilities: Hangar and flight deck

The Pierre Radisson-class icebreakers, also known as R-class icebreakers, are a class of four icebreakers constructed for and operated by the Canadian Coast Guard. The Canadian Coast Guard designates the four ships in the class as medium icebreakers. Built in two phases, the first three ships, Pierre Radisson, Franklin and Des Groseilliers, were built to a common design. The fourth, Henry Larsen was built to a modified design and is considered a subclass, the Improved R-class icebreaker. Franklin was later renamed Sir John Franklin before undergoing a re-design for use primarily as an Arctic research vessel. Upon the vessel's return to service, the ship was once again renamed Amundsen. All the vessels are named for people who sailed through Canada's northern waters. The class operates in the Arctic Ocean in the summer, patrolling, icebreaking and research missions.

== Design and description ==
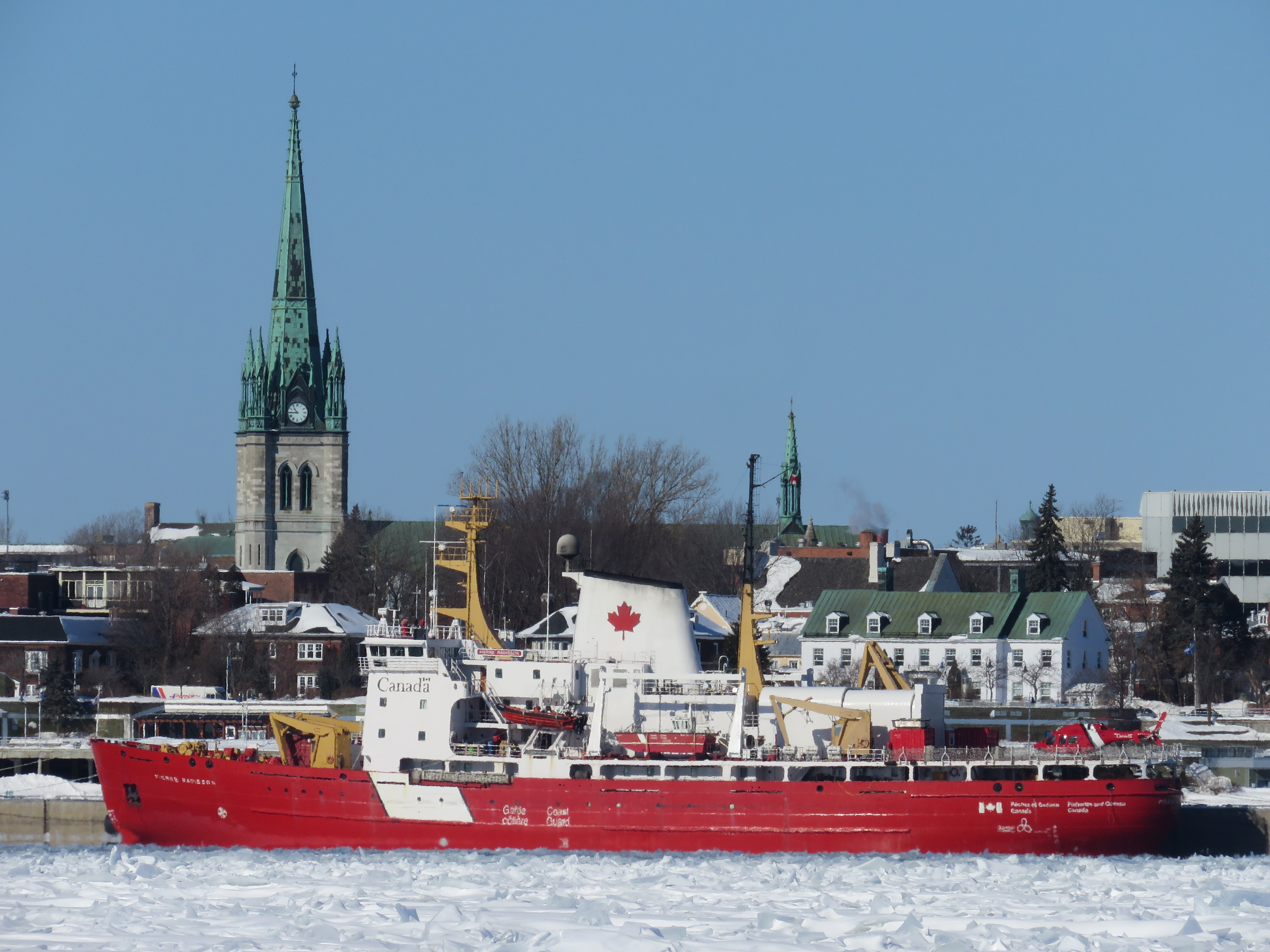
CCGS Pierre Radisson docked at Trois-Rivières with a Bell 429 GlobalRanger on deck

The Pierre Radisson class were designed for Coast Guard operations in the Arctic Ocean. Pierre Radisson, being the first ship constructed in the class, has a standard displacement of 6,400 long tons (6,500 t) and 8,180 long tons (8,310 t) fully loaded. As built the vessel has a gross register tonnage (GRT) of 5,910, a 1,678 net tonnage (NT) and 2,865 tons deadweight (DWT). The ship is 98.3 metres (322 ft 6 in) long overall with a beam of 19.5 metres (64 ft 0 in) and a draught of 7.2 metres (23 ft 7 in). The tonnage was later remeasured to 5,775 gross tonnage (GT).

The vessel is propelled by two fixed-pitch propellers and one bow thruster powered by a diesel-electric system comprising six Alco M251F diesel engines that when driving the shafts create 17,580 shaft horsepower (13,110 kW) and six GEC generators creating 11.1 megawatts sustained powering two motors that when driving the shafts create 13,600 shp (10,100 kW). The vessel is also equipped with one Caterpillar 398 emergency generator. This gives the vessel a maximum speed of 16 knots (30 km/h). The vessel can carry 2,450 m^{3} (540,000 imp gal) of diesel fuel and has a range of 15,000 nautical miles (28,000 km) at 15 knots (28 km/h) and can stay at sea for up to 120 days.

Pierre Radisson is equipped with a Sperry navigational radar operating on the E/F and I bands. The icebreaker has a flight deck and hangar which originally accommodated a MBB Bo 105 or Bell 206L light helicopter, but currently supports the Bell 429 GlobalRanger and Bell 412EPI which were acquired by the Canadian Coast Guard in the 2010s to replace the older helicopters. The ship can carry 25.9 m^{3} (5,700 imp gal) of aviation fuel for the helicopters. The vessel is certified as Arctic Class 3 and has a complement of 31 with 11 officers and 20 crew.

=== Improved R class ===
General characteristics for Henry Larsen as built
- Tonnage: 6,166 GT; 1,756 NT
- Displacement: 8,290 long tons (8,420 t) full load
- Length: 99.8 m (327 ft 5 in)
- Beam: 19.6 m (64 ft 4 in)
- Draught: 7.3 m (23 ft 11 in)
- Ice class: Arctic Class 4
- Propulsion: Diesel electric – 2 × GE AC and 3 × Wärtsilä Vasa 16V32; 12,174 kW (16,326 hp)
- Speed: 16 knots (30 km/h; 18 mph)
- Range: 20,000 nautical miles (37,000 km; 23,000 mi) at 13.5 knots (25.0 km/h; 15.5 mph)
- Endurance: 90 days
- Capacity: 40
- Complement: 31
- Sensors & processing systems: 1 × Sperry Marine Bridgemaster navigational radar
- Aircraft carried: 1 × light helicopter
- Aviation facilities: Hangar and flight deck

Classified as a Medium Gulf/River Icebreaker by the Canadian Coast Guard, Henry Larsen was ordered to a modified design from the rest of the class. The vessel's hull form differs from her classmates, with a differently-shaped bow with a raised forecastle and underwater "ice knife". The vessel also has a different propulsion system. Furthermore, the ship has a Wärtsilä air-bubbling system installed to allow the vessel to reduce hull friction and more easily break ice. Henry Larsen displaces 8,290 long tons (8,420 t) at full load. The vessel has a 6,166 gross tonnage (GT) and a 1,756 net tonnage (NT) making her the largest vessel in the class. The icebreaker is 99.8 metres (327 ft 5 in) long overall with a beam of 19.6 metres (64 ft 4 in) and a draught of 7.3 metres (23 ft 11 in).

The ship is propelled by two fixed-pitch propellers driven by a diesel-electric system comprising two GE AC electric motors and three Wärtsilä Vasa 16V32 diesel engines. Combined, the system creates 12,174 kilowatts (16,326 hp), giving the ship a maximum speed of 16 knots (30 km/h; 18 mph). The ship carries 1,650 m^{3} (360,000 imp gal) of diesel fuel, giving the ship a range of 20,000 nautical miles (37,000 km; 23,000 mi) at 13.5 knots (25.0 km/h; 15.5 mph) and can stay at sea for up to 90 days.

The icebreaker is equipped with a Sperry Marine Bridgemaster navigational radar. Henry Larsen has a flight deck and hangar located at the stern of the ship which originally accommodated a MBB Bo 105 or Bell 206L light helicopter, but currently supports the Bell 429 GlobalRanger and Bell 412EPI which were acquired by the Canadian Coast Guard in the 2010s to replace the older helicopters. The ship can carry 22.0 m^{3} (4,800 imp gal) of aviation fuel for the helicopters. The vessel is certified as Arctic Class 4 and has a complement of 31 with 11 officers and 20 crew and 40 additional berths. The vessel is also equipped with a hospital ward.

=== Amundsen modifications ===
In 2003, Sir John Franklin was reactivated and transformed into a hybrid science ship. Part of the vessel's storage holds were transformed into laboratory space. The refit included the addition of a moon pool, which enables scientists to lower scientific instruments from inside the hull without cutting a hole in the ice, multi-beam sonar, the replacement of heating and electrical systems, and installation of state-of-the-art scientific equipment.

== Ships in class ==
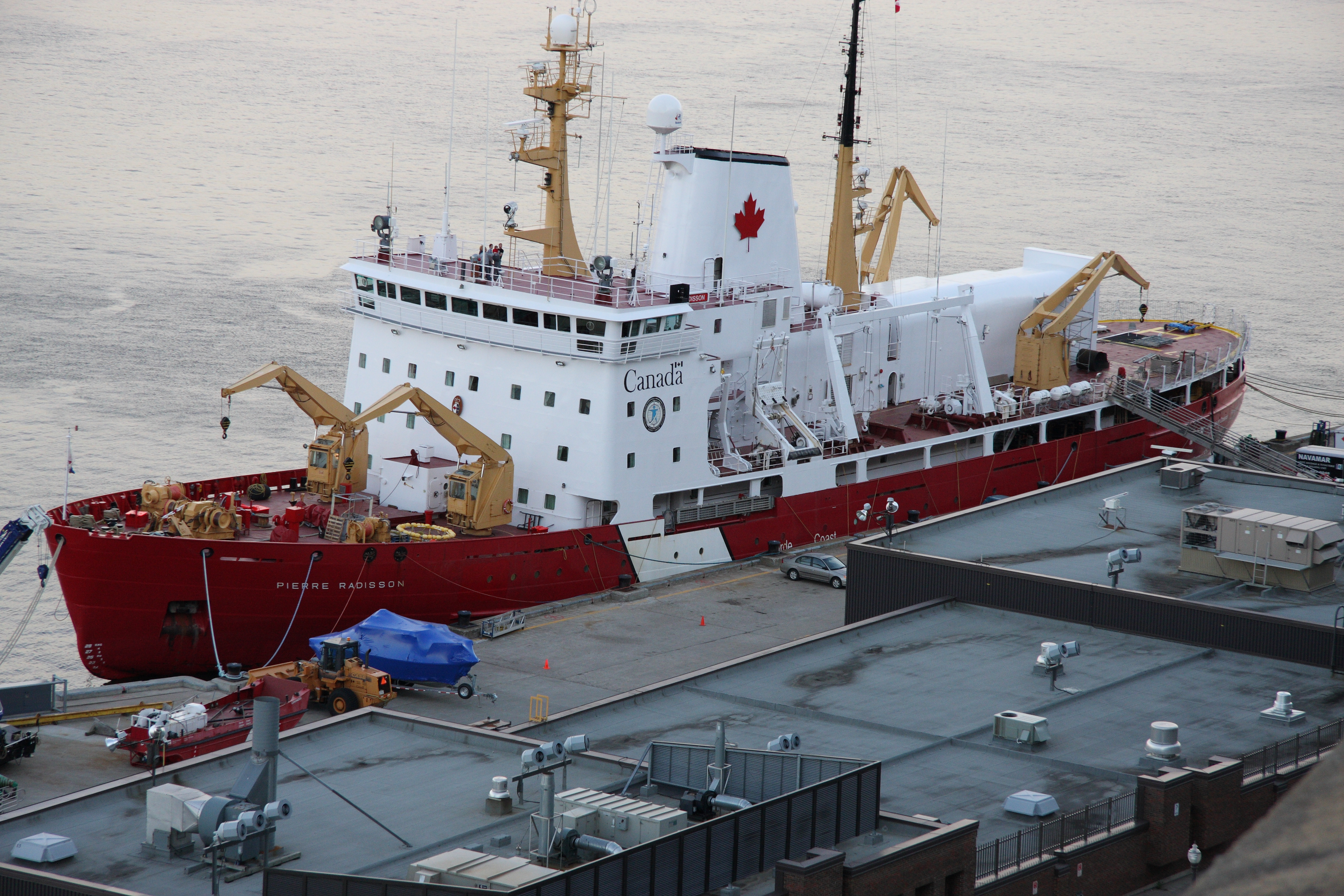
CCGS Pierre Radisson

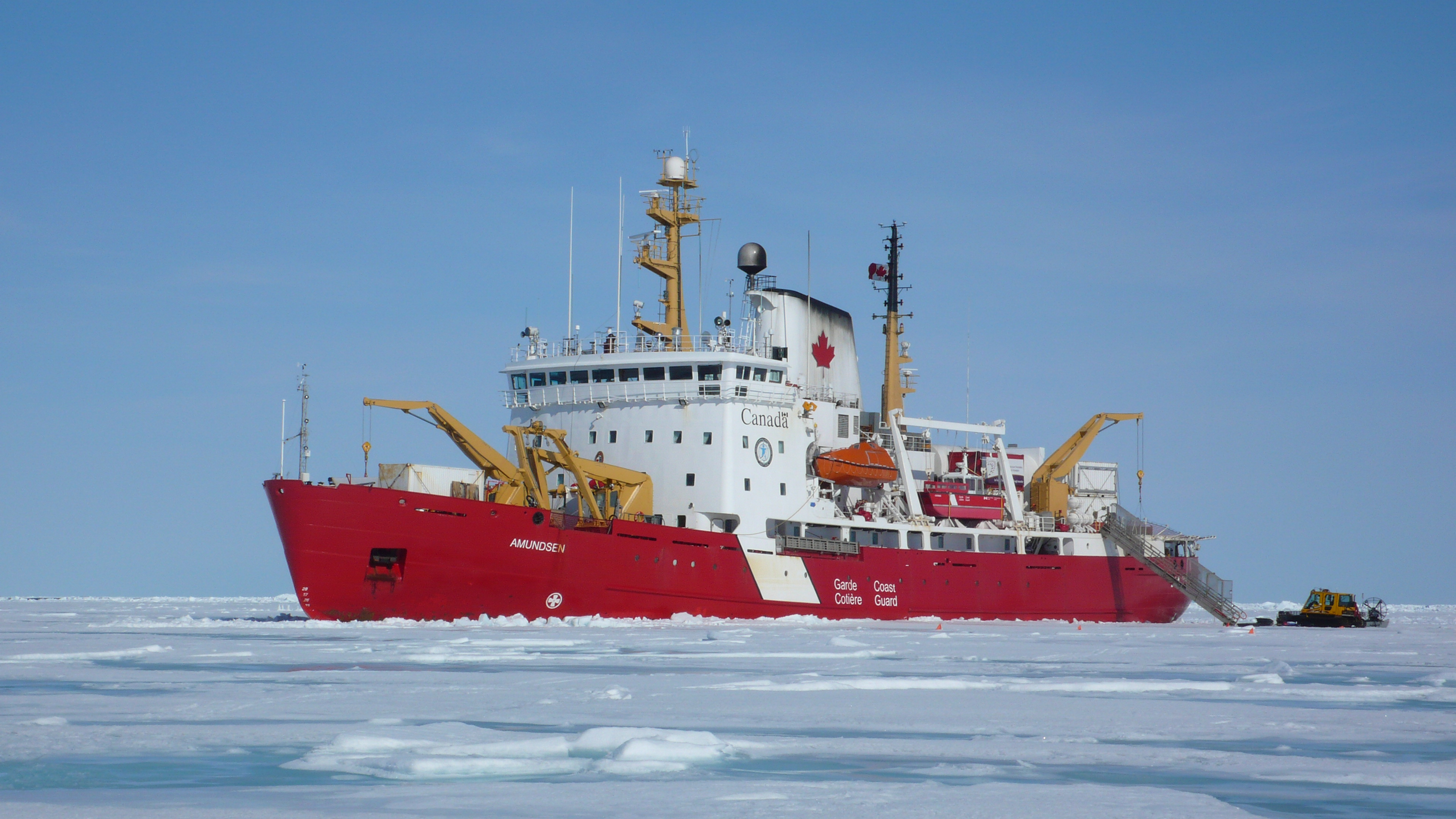
CCGS Amundsen

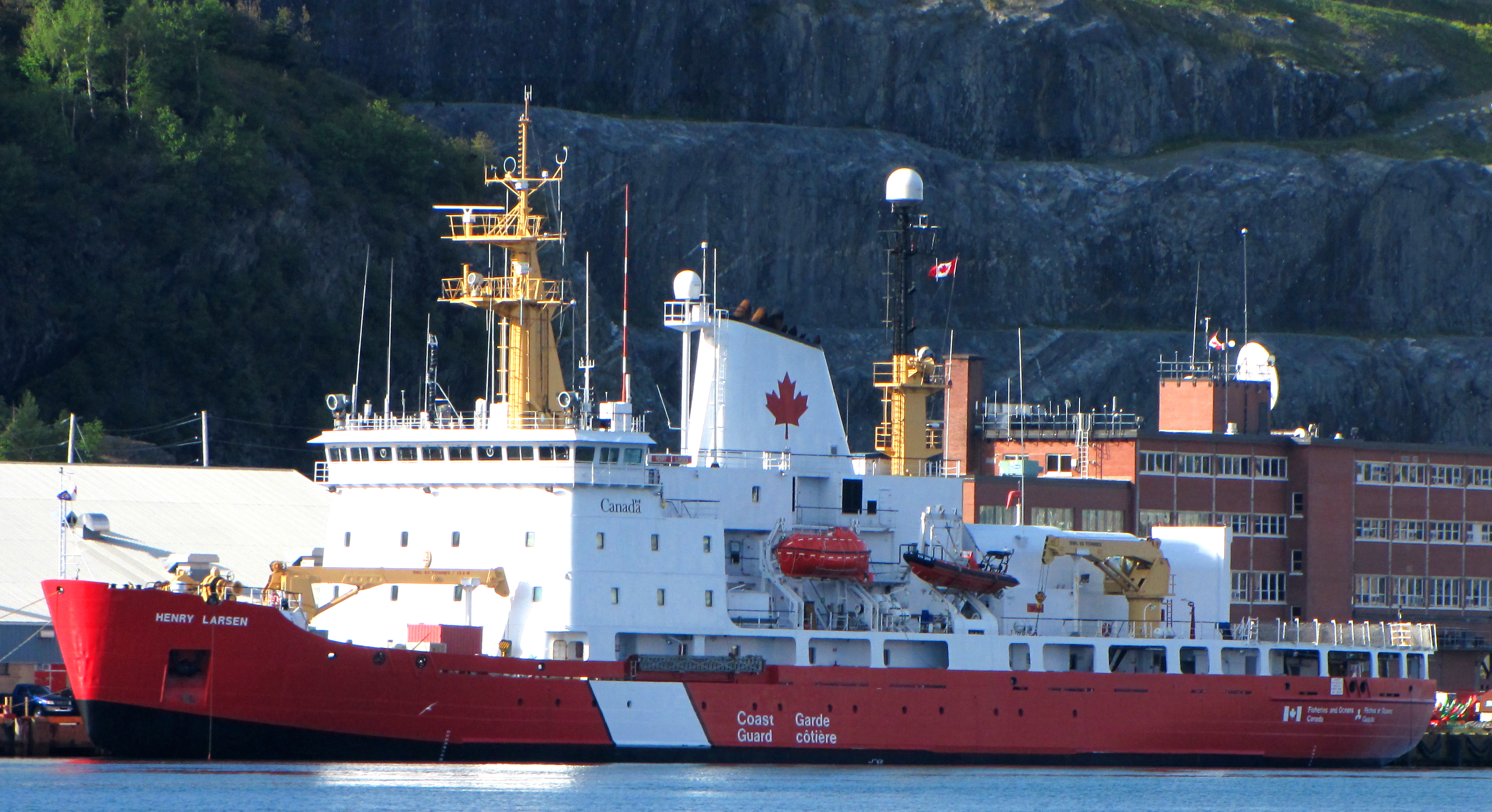
CCGS Henry Larsen in St. John's Harbour, 2010

Pierre Radisson class construction data
Name	Builder	Launched	In service	Status
Pierre Radisson	Versatile Pacific Shipyards Limited, Vancouver	3 June 1977	June 1978	In service
Amundsen (ex-Franklin, Sir John Franklin)	Burrard Dry Dock, North Vancouver	10 March 1978	March 1979	In service
Des Groseilliers	Port Weller Dry Docks Limited, St. Catharines	20 February 1982	August 1982	In service
Improved R class
Henry Larsen	Versatile Pacific Shipyards Limited, Vancouver	23 August 1985	29 June 1988	In service

== Service history ==
The first three ships entered service between 1977 and 1982. Pierre Radisson, the first ship of the class, underwent sea trials while transiting the Northwest Passage en route to Quebec City. During the transit, Pierre Radisson assisted CCGS Camsell which had been severely damaged by ice in the western Arctic. After completion, Franklin, the second ship of the class, performed sea trials in the western Arctic and Northwest Passage. While transiting the Northwest Passage, heading to the icebreaker's assigned base in Newfoundland, Franklin lost a propeller in Viscount Melville Sound and was rescued by CCGS Louis S. St-Laurent and returned to the west coast. The two ships then transited to the East Coast of Canada via the Panama Canal. In 1980, the vessel was renamed to Sir John Franklin at the request of the crew. In 1983, Des Groseilliers, the third vessel in the class, made her first voyage to the Arctic.

In April 1984, after the opening of the navigation season on the Saint Lawrence Seaway and the Great Lakes, the area froze up, driving six cargo ships ashore and a further eighteen became stuck in the ice. Five icebreakers were assigned to aid the merchant vessels, however, they proved unable to meet the task. Des Groseilliers and CCGS Griffon were sent to their aid, with Des Groseilliers arriving on 11 April and worked to free the stuck vessels and provide safe passage until 29 April.

In 1987, Sir John Franklin escorted the Arctic cargo ship/oil tanker MV Arctic to Nanisivik. In July 1989, the icebreaker again attempted to transit the Northwest Passage but was forced to break off the attempt after ice conditions were found to be too severe. In June 1994, at the height of the Turbot War, Sir John Franklin was among the Coast Guard vessels sent to monitor the European fishing fleets on the Grand Banks. The ship was kept just out of sight but within radar range of foreign fishing trawlers. These actions led to the detainment and seizure of the Spanish fishing trawler Estai.

In 1988, Henry Larsen joined the fleet. On the ship's maiden voyage from Victoria, British Columbia to Dartmouth, Nova Scotia, the vessel transited the Northwest Passage, performing sea trials on the trip. Following the 1995 transfer of the Canadian Coast Guard from the Department of Transport to the Department of Fisheries and Oceans, Sir John Franklin was deemed surplus to the fleet in 1996. In August 2003 after funding was received for the new dedicated research vessel, and Sir John Franklin was taken to Les Mechins, Quebec to be refitted as a research ship. The ship reentered service that year and was renamed Amundsen.

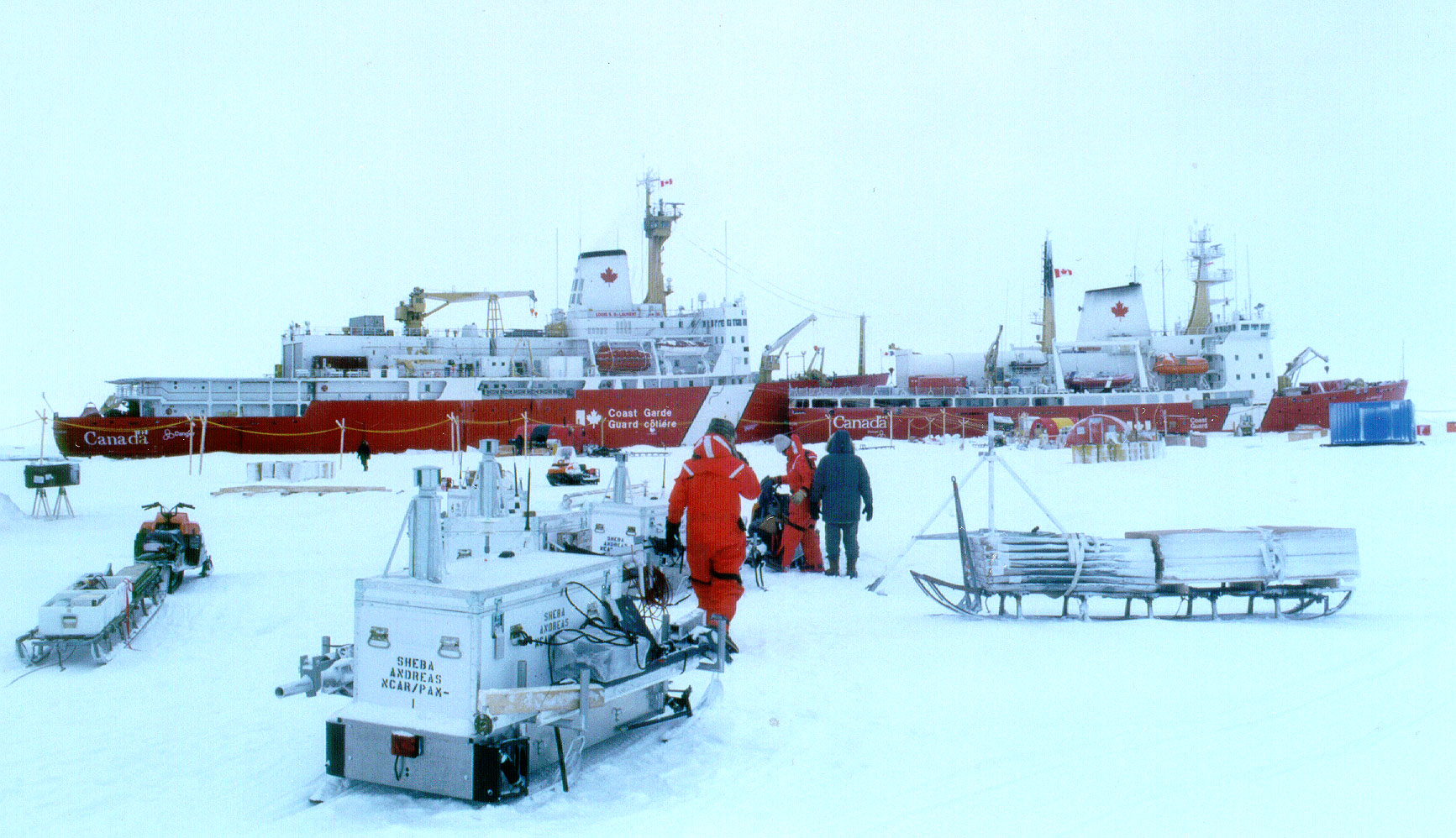
Ice station SHEBA base, Des Groseilliers (right) with Louis S. St-Laurent

As part of the Surface Heat Budget of the Arctic Ocean (SHEBA) experiment in 1997, Louis S. St-Laurent and Des Groseilliers sailed through the Northwest Passage to meet CCGS Sir Wilfrid Laurier in Alaskan waters. Sir Wilfrid Laurier then escorted Des Groseilliers to a point where Des Groseilliers's engines were shut off on 2 October and the ship was left with a minimum crew and a group of international scientists. The vessel was then left to drift in the pack ice for a year and dubbed "Ice Station SHEBA".

Pierre Radisson participated in Operation Nanook in 2008 and 2009, annual joint training exercises with elements of the Canadian Forces to conduct sovereignty and disaster patrols in the Canadian Arctic. In 2011, it was announced that an image of Amundsen would be placed on the backside of the new Canadian 50 Dollar polymer banknote. This was intended to mark Canada's northern frontier and arctic research In September 2013, Henry Larsen was sent to aid sister ship Amundsen in recovering a MBB Bo 155 helicopter that had deployed from Amundsen and crashed near Banks Island killing three crew members including Amundsen's master. The helicopter had sunk in 420 metres (1,380 ft) of water and Henry Larsen assisted Amundsen in keeping the ice clear while Amundsen brought the helicopter wreckage back to the surface. In August 2014, Henry Larsen participated in Operation Nanook.
