= CCGS N.B. McLean =

Canadian Coast Guard icebreaker

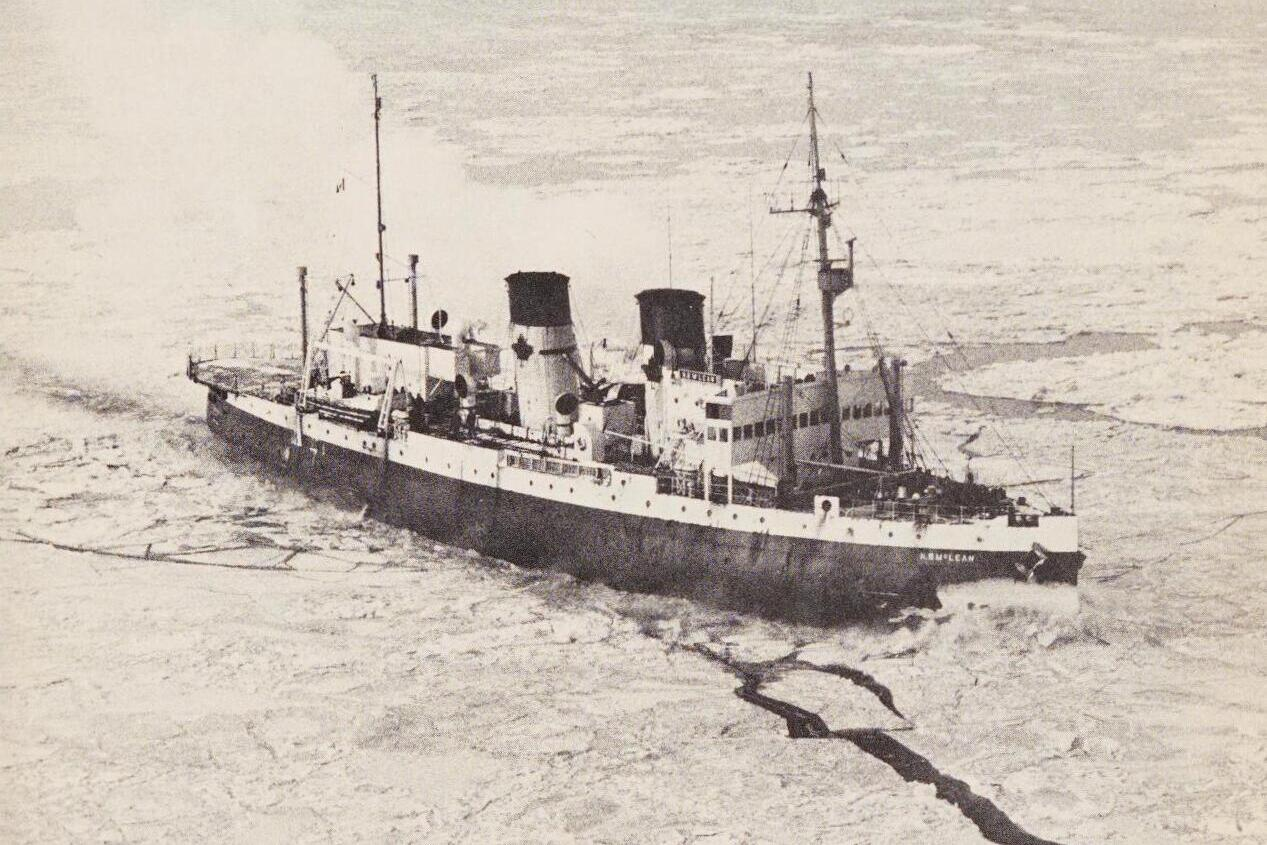
- CGS N.B. McLean, 1974

History

Canada
- Name: N.B. McLean
- Operator: Department of Marine, Marine Service section; Canadian Coast Guard
- Builder: Halifax Shipyard, Halifax, Nova Scotia
- Yard number: 5
- Commissioned: 1930
- Decommissioned: 1979
- In service: 1930–1979
- Stricken: 1987
- Home port: CCG Base Quebec City, Quebec
- Identification: IMO number: 5244912
- Fate: Scrapped 1989

General characteristics
- Type: Heavy icebreaker
- Tonnage: 3,254 GRT
- Length: 260 ft (79 m)
- Beam: 60 ft (18 m)
- Draught: 20 ft (6.1 m)
- Propulsion: 2 × triple expansion steam engines; 4 × Babcock & Wilcox boilers; 6,500 ihp (4,800 kW)
- Speed: 15 knots (28 km/h; 17 mph)

CCGS N.B. McLean (Note: CCGS stands for Canadian Coast Guard Ship) was a Canadian Coast Guard icebreaker. Constructed in 1930 at Halifax Shipyards, she entered service as CGS N.B. MacLean and served in the Department of Transport's Marine Service, using the prefix "Canadian Government Ship". The ship was transferred into the newly created Canadian Coast Guard in 1962. She served in the St. Lawrence River and Gulf of St. Lawrence until she was decommissioned in 1979, and taken to Taiwan to be scrapped in 1989. She was replaced by CCGS Pierre Radisson.

== Design and description ==
The design of the vessel was an evolution of previous Canadian icebreakers Montcalm and J.D. Hazen. The icebreaker was 260 ft (79 m) long overall with a beam of 60 ft (18 m) and a draught of 20 ft (6.1 m). The ship had a gross register tonnage (GRT) of 3,254. N.B. McLean was powered by four Babcock & Wilcox boilers providing steam to two triple expansion engines each driving one screw, creating 6,500 indicated horsepower (4,800 kW). This gave the ship a maximum speed of 15 knots (28 km/h).

== Service history ==
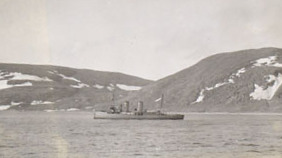
CGS N.B. McLean in Greenland, 1933

The icebreaker was constructed by Halifax Shipyard at Halifax, Nova Scotia with the yard number 5. The vessel was completed in August 1930 and named for Nathan B. McLean, a government official who led an expedition to Hudson Bay in 1927. N.B. McLean entered service with the Department of Transport's Marine Service and made annual trips to Hudson Bay and the Arctic Ocean from 1930 to 1970. Due to the Great Depression, no major icebreakers were added to the government fleet and N.B. McLean remained the most powerful icebreaker in Canada's fleet until 1950.

In 1962, all Marine Service icebreakers were transferred to the newly created Canadian Coast Guard. In the 1960s a flight deck and hangar were added to the stern of the ship. N.B. McLean made her final voyage to the Arctic in 1970 and was used on the St. Lawrence River and in the Gulf of St. Lawrence until being taken out of service in 1979. Following her decommissioning, efforts to turn the vessel into a museum ship at Quebec City, Quebec failed and the vessel was sold for scrap in 1988. The vessel was taken to Kaoshiung, Taiwan and arrived on 20 February 1989 to be broken up. The vessel was replaced by CCGS Pierre Radisson.

== See also ==
- CCGS D'Iberville – CCGS icebreaker was scrapped together with N.B. McLean.
