= CCGS Pierre Radisson =

Icebreaker of the Canadian Coast Guard

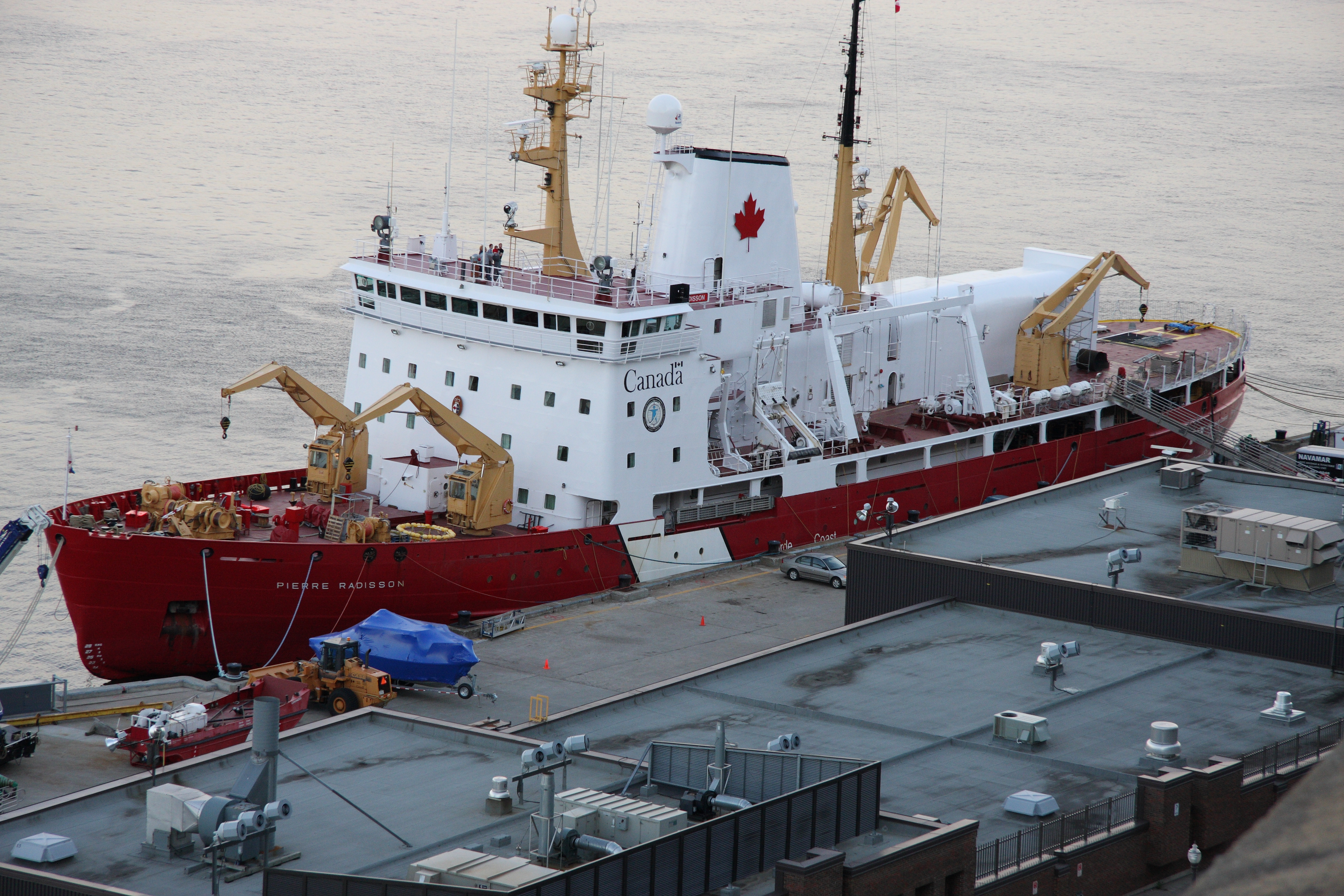
- CCGS Pierre Radisson

History

Canada
- Name: Pierre Radisson
- Namesake: Pierre Radisson
- Operator: Canadian Coast Guard
- Port of registry: Ottawa, Ontario
- Builder: Burrard Dry Dock Co. Ltd., North Vancouver
- Yard number: 221
- Launched: 3 June 1977
- Commissioned: June 1978
- In service: 1978–present
- Refit: 1995, 1996–1997, 2016-2017
- Home port: CCG Base Quebec City
- Identification: CGSB; IMO number: 7510834
- Status: in active service

General characteristics
- Class & type: Pierre Radisson-class icebreaker
- Tonnage: 5,910 GRT (as built); 5,775 GT; 1,678 NT
- Displacement: 6,400 long tons (6,500 t) standard; 8,180 long tons (8,310 t) fully loaded
- Length: 98.3 m (322 ft 6 in)
- Beam: 19.5 m (64 ft 0 in)
- Draught: 7.2 m (23 ft 7 in)
- Ice class: CASPPR Arctic Class 3
- Installed power: Diesel-electric: 6 x Alco M251F, 17,580 shp (13,110 kW); 6 GEC generators, 2 motors 13,600 shp (10,100 kW)
- Propulsion: 2 shafts, bow thruster
- Speed: 16 knots (30 km/h)
- Range: 15,000 nmi (28,000 km) at 13.5 knots (25.0 km/h)
- Endurance: 120 days
- Complement: 38
- Aircraft carried: Originally 1 × MBB Bo 105 or Bell 206L helicopter, currently 1 × Bell 429 GlobalRanger or Bell 412EPI
- Aviation facilities: Hangar and flight deck

CCGS Pierre Radisson (Note: CCGS stands for Canadian Coast Guard Ship) is the lead ship of her class of icebreakers. Constructed and operated by the Canadian Coast Guard, the vessel is based at Quebec City on the Saint Lawrence River. The ship was constructed in British Columbia in the 1970s and has been in service ever since. The vessel is named for Pierre-Esprit Radisson, a 17th-century French fur trader and explorer.

== Design and description ==
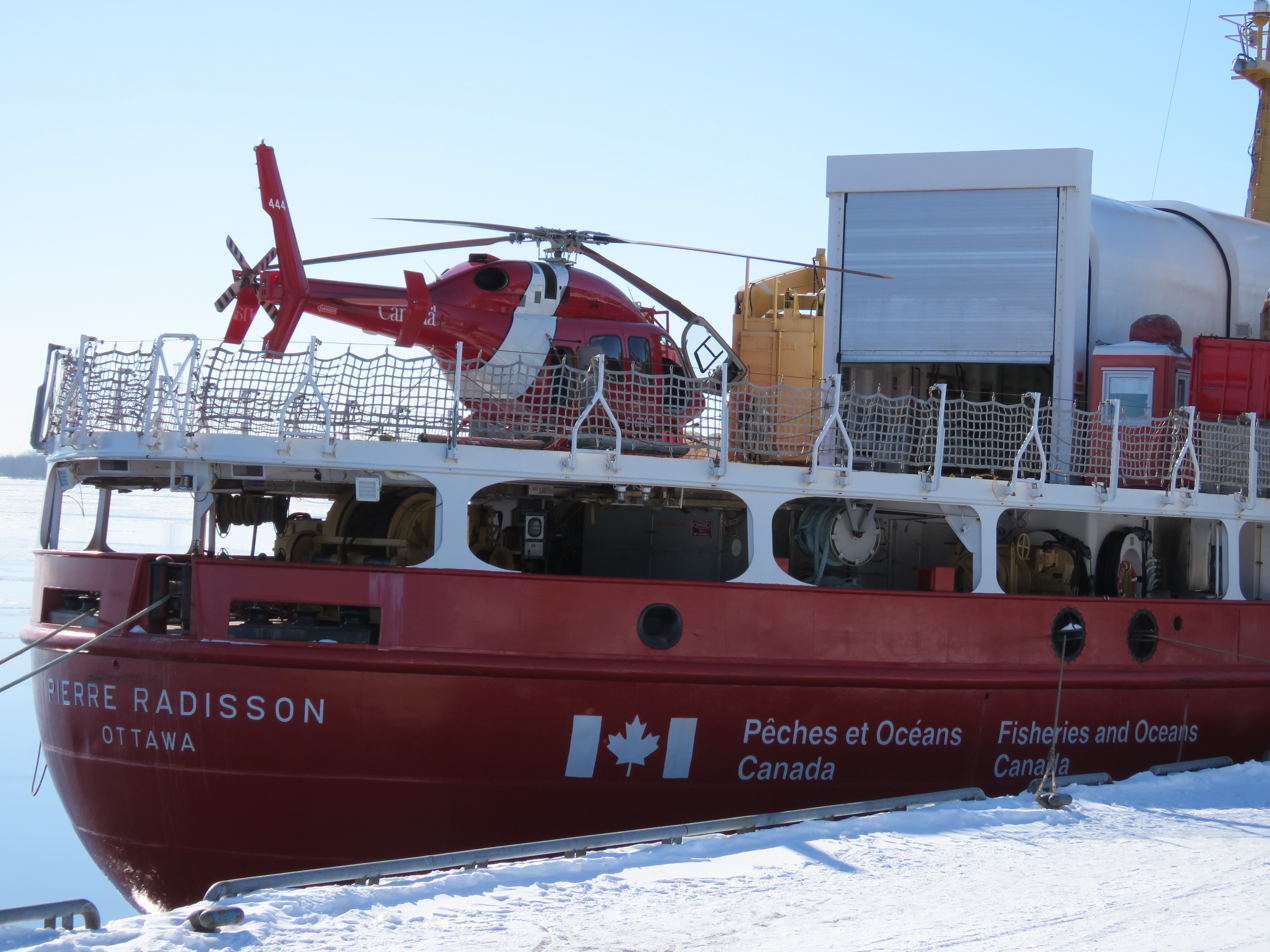
Bell 429 GlobalRanger on the helicopter deck of CCGS Pierre Radisson

The Pierre Radisson class were designed for Canadian Coast Guard operations in the Arctic Ocean. Pierre Radisson, being the first ship constructed in the class, has a standard displacement of 6,400 long tons (6,500 t) and 8,180 long tons (8,310 t) fully loaded. The vessel has a gross tonnage (GT) of 5,775 and a 1,678 net tonnage (NT). The ship is 98.3 metres (322 ft 6 in) long overall with a beam of 19.5 metres (64 ft 0 in) and a draught of 7.2 metres (23 ft 7 in).

The vessel is propelled by two fixed-pitch propellers and one bow thruster powered by a diesel-electric system comprising six Alco M251F diesel engines that when driving the shafts create 17,580 shaft horsepower (13,110 kW) and six GEC generators creating 11.1 megawatts sustained powering two motors that when driving the shafts create 13,600 shp (10,100 kW). The vessel is also equipped with one Caterpillar 398 emergency generator. This gives the vessel a maximum speed of 16 knots (30 km/h). The vessel can carry 2,450 m^{3} (540,000 imp gal) of diesel fuel and has a range of 15,000 nautical miles (28,000 km) at 15 knots (28 km/h) and can stay at sea for up to 120 days.

Pierre Radisson is equipped with a Sperry navigational radar operating on the E/F and I bands. The icebreaker has a flight deck and hangar which originally accommodated light helicopters of the MBB Bo 105 or Bell 206L types, but in the 2010s, the Bell 429 GlobalRanger and Bell 412EPI were acquired by the Canadian Coast Guard to replace the older helicopters. The ship can carry 25.9 m^{3} (910 cu ft) of aviation fuel for the helicopters. The vessel is certified as Arctic Class 3 and has a complement of 31 with 11 officers and 20 crew.

== Service history ==
The ship's keel was laid down by Burrard Dry Dock in North Vancouver, British Columbia on 16 February 1976. The vessel was launched on 3 June 1977 and was completed in May 1978. The vessel entered service with the Canadian Coast Guard in June 1978. Registered in Ottawa, Ontario, Pierre Radisson was intended to replace the aging CCGS N.B. McLean in the Laurentian Region and is based at Quebec City, Quebec. The vessel underwent sea trials while transiting the Northwest Passage en route to Quebec City. During the transit, Pierre Radisson assisted CCGS Camsell which had been severely damaged by ice in the western Arctic.

During the winter period, the vessel performs icebreaking duties through the Gulf of St. Lawrence, St. Lawrence River and Saguenay River, up the St. Lawrence Seaway and into the Great Lakes. The vessel is also deployed escorting ships through the ice-covered passages. In the summer, Pierre Radisson is assigned to escort commercial ships, maintain navigation aids and search and rescue missions in the Canadian Arctic. The ship also provides support to scientific missions while in the Canadian Arctic.

In 1981, Pierre Radisson supported the search by Joseph B. MacInnis in the search for the sunken British supply vessel Breadalbane. The search was unsuccessful that year, MacInnis did later find the wreck in 1983. In 1982, the ship acted as the vice-regal yacht for Governor General Edward Schreyer on his visit to Denmark, Norway, Iceland and Greenland to celebrate the 1000th anniversary of the Norse settlement of L'Anse aux Meadows. In 1987, Pierre Radisson escorted cargo ships to Thule, Greenland. The following year, the icebreaker sailed to the aid of CCGS Martha L. Black which had damaged her propellers twice in the Beaufort Sea. Pierre Radisson escorted the damaged ship to Halifax, Nova Scotia and then returned via the Panama Canal, dropping off relief supplies to hurricane victims at Kingston, Jamaica.

In 1987, Pierre Radisson was used to give 30 heads of state a three-hour tour of the St. Lawrence River during the Sommet de la Francophonie. The icebreaker supported the North Water project in April—May 1997 and again in August 1998. Pierre Radisson's duties included installing deep-moored scientific buoys and recovering them the following year. Pierre Radisson participated in Operation Nanook in 2008 and 2009, annual joint training exercises with elements of the Canadian Forces to conduct sovereignty and disaster patrols in the Canadian Arctic.

On 27 July 2015, CCGS Pierre Radisson located and rescued Sergey Ananov, a Russian helicopter pilot who attempted a round-the world flight. Ananov's Robinson R22 helicopter crashed and sunk in the Davis Strait, between Baffin Island and Greenland, the previous day, but the pilot managed to swim to a nearby ice floe.

The CAN$8.7 million contract for the vessel's refit was awarded on 10 August 2016 to Verreault Navigation Inc. with the work to be done at Les Méchins, Quebec, as part of the National Shipbuilding Procurement Strategy. The refit was scheduled to be completed by January 2017. The refit included re-coating the hull, replacement of windows, reconditioning the flight deck and hangar and maintenance to steel work, propulsion and the interior.

In March 2018, Pierre Radisson was deployed to the St. Lawrence River and Great Lakes to aid in icebreaking efforts. On 24 August 2018, Pierre Radisson was directed to assist Akademik Ioffre, a cruise ship that had run aground in the western Gulf of Boothia. Once Akademik Ioffre was refloated, Pierre Radisson remained with the cruise ship to determine which port Akademik Ioffre would sail to and to ensure the cruise ship's safety.

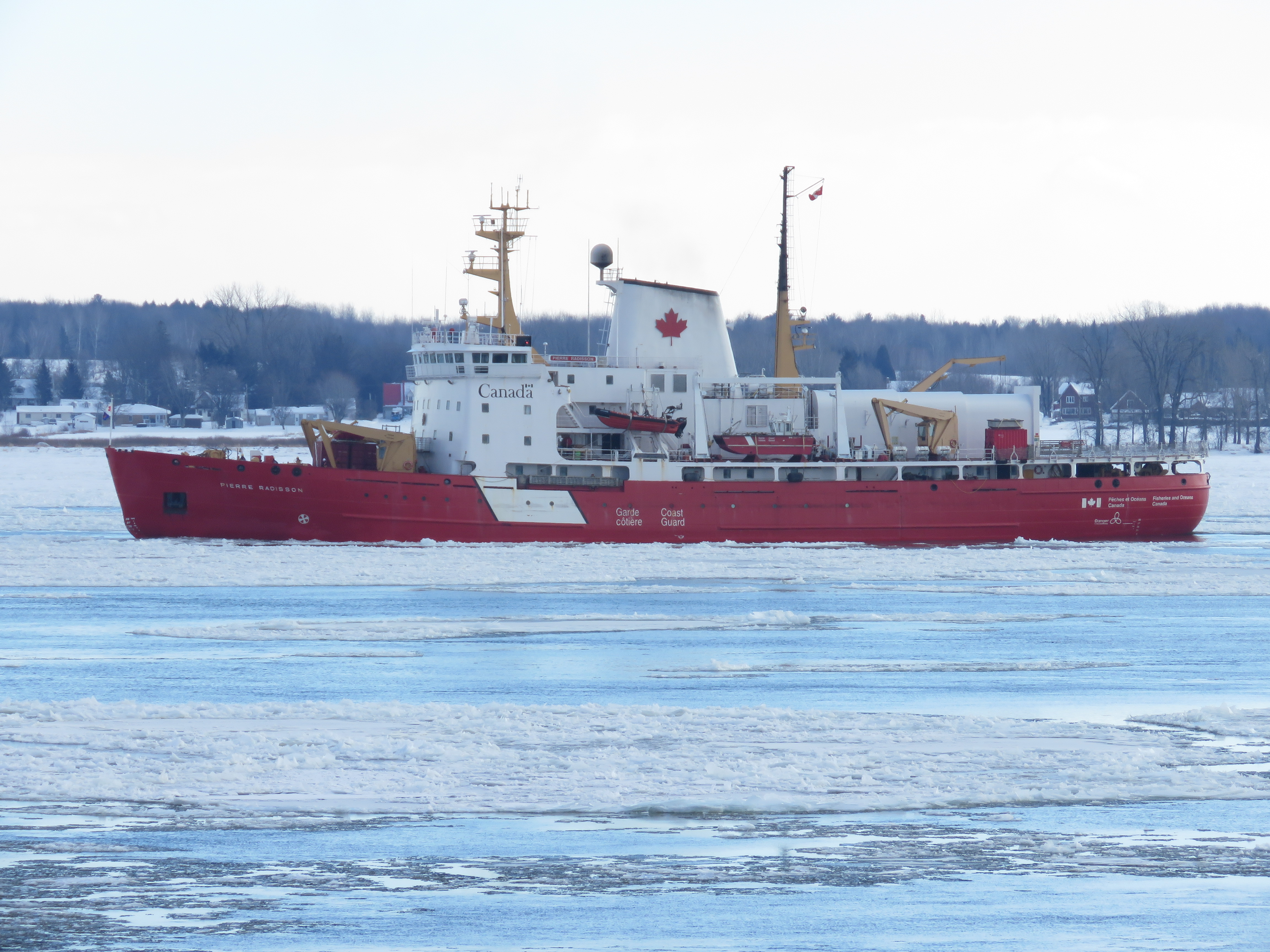
CCGS Pierre Radisson at Nicolet, Quebec, in February 2021

In January 2019, CCGS Des Groseilliers and Pierre Radisson were both deployed to the Saint Lawrence River after large ice jams closed the shipping lane, trapping merchant vessels in Montreal and Trois-Rivières, Quebec. On 22 January 2022, the icebreaker was struck by the cargo ship Federal Crimson while escorting the freighter through ice in the St. Lawrence River near Sainte-Foy. The stern of Pierre Radisson was damaged in the collision and the vessel was sent back to Quebec City for repairs.

== Workboat/lifeboat ==
Canadian Coast Guard ice breaker Pierre Radisson's workboat/lifeboat No.2 was repurposed as a training boat/work boat (13D17073) that has been operated by the Maritime Affairs Committee Navy League of Canada – Outaouais Branch since November 1998. The boat was named John Boucher, in honour of the founder of the Royal Canadian Navy (RCN) Sea Cadet Corps la Hulloise, which is sponsored by the Outaouais Branch of the Navy League of Canada. The main purpose of the boat today is to provide training for RCN Sea Cadet Corps la Hulloise. When not used by the sea cadets, it serves as a workboat for the Navy League.
