= RV Coriolis II =

Canadian research vessel

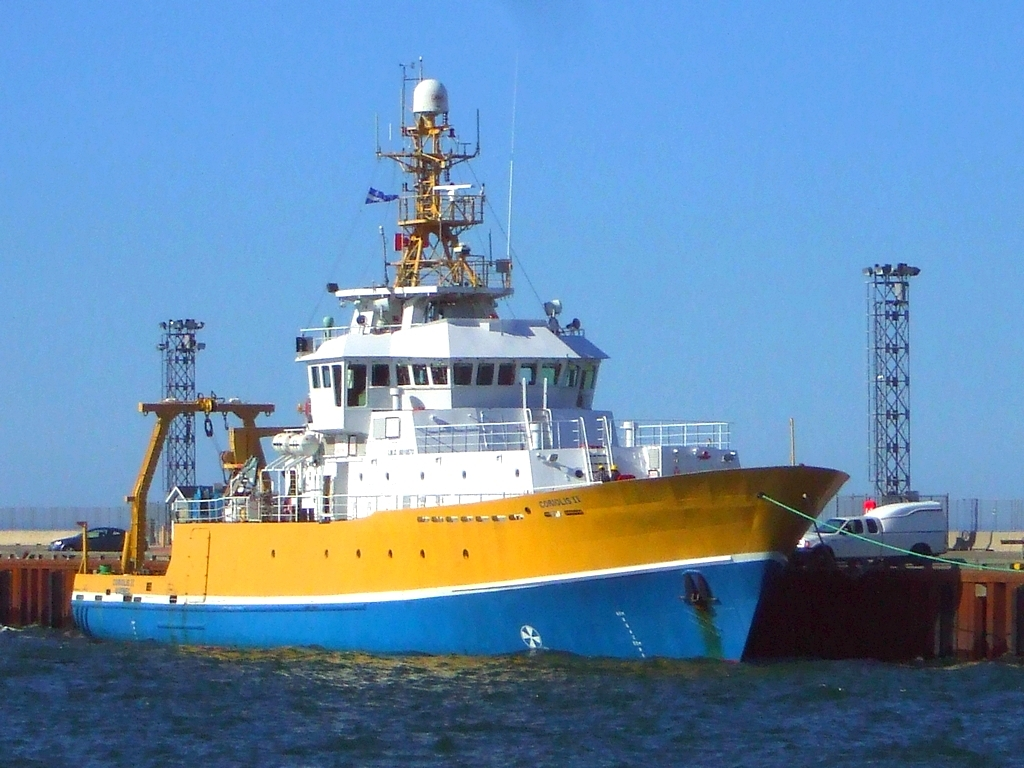
- Canadian research vessel, Coriolis II at her home port of Rimouski, Quebec

History

Canada
- Name: John Jacobson
- Builder: Versatile Pacific Shipyard, Esquimalt, British Columbia
- Yard number: 558
- Launched: 1990
- Completed: 1991
- Out of service: 1999
- Fate: Sold for commercial purposes 2001

History
- Name: Coriolis II
- Port of registry: (Canada) Rimouski, Quebec
- Acquired: 2001
- Identification: IMO number: 8818570
- Status: Ship in active service

General characteristics (as built)
- Type: Search and rescue patrol vessel
- Tonnage: 863 GT
- Length: 50.0 m (164 ft 1 in)
- Beam: 11.0 m (36 ft 1 in)
- Draught: 5.2 m (17 ft 1 in)
- Propulsion: 2 × screw, diesel engine, 3,480 bhp (2,600 kW)
- Speed: 16 knots (30 km/h; 18 mph)

Coriolis II is a Canadian research vessel. She is homeported in Rimouski, Quebec. She is operated by a consortium of five institutions: Institut des sciences de la mer à Rimouski (ISMER), the Université du Québec à Montréal (UQAM), McGill University, the Institut national de la recherche scientifique - Eau, terre et environnement (INRS-ETE) and the Maurice Lamontagne Institute (MLI-DFO). The vessel was constructed in 1990 by Versatile Pacific Shipyards of Esquimalt, British Columbia for the Canadian Coast Guard. Initially named CCGS John Jacobson, (Note: CCGS stands for Canadian Coast Guard Ship) the vessel was deployed for search and rescue missions along Canada's coastlines. The Canadian Coast Guard took John Jacobson out of service in 1999 and sold the ship to her current owners in 2001.

== Description ==
As built John Jacobson was 50.0 metres (164 ft 1 in) long with a beam of 11.0 metres (36 ft 1 in) and a draught of 5.2 metres (17 ft 1 in). The ship was powered by a diesel engine driving two shafts rated at 3,480 brake horsepower (2,600 kW). This gave the ship a maximum speed of 16 knots (30 km/h; 18 mph). The vessels gross tonnage (GT) is disputed by the sources. The Miramar Ship Index states that the gross tonnage was 863 tons and Maginley & Collin state the tonnage as 836 tons. The ship has 22 berths.

== Service history ==
The ship was constructed by Versatile Pacific Shipyards at their yard in Esquimalt, British Columbia in 1990 with the yard number 558. The ship was completed in 1991 and entered service with the Canadian Coast Guard as CCGS John Jacobson. John Jacobson and sister ship CCGS Gordon Reid were ordered as larger, more capable replacements for the R-class patrol vessels that the Canadian Coast Guard operated at the time. The ship was taken out of service the Canadian Coast Guard in 1999 and laid up at Esquimalt. In 2001, the vessel was sold to a consortium of universities based in Rimouski, Quebec for conversion to a research vessel.

The ship took 33 days to travel to her new homeport of Rimouski, passing through the Panama Canal. After arrival, the ship went into drydock for conversion to a research vessel, which included the installation of more powerful generators. Renamed Coriolis II, the ship's main scientific focus is to study the sediment in the Saint Lawrence River. The vessel's research efforts currently lies between Île d'Orléans and the Cabot Strait. In February-March 2014, Coriolis II sailed to San Jorge Gulf in Argentina to study the gulf's ecosystem and geology as part of Argentina's efforts to understand its maritime resources and environment. In June 2014, the ship was hired by a subcontractor of Shell Canada to perform geological surveys for oil exploration off the Nova Scotia coast.

== Related articles ==
- Université du Québec à Rimouski (UQAR)

== Sources ==
- Maginley, Charles D. & Collin, Bernard (2001). The Ships of Canada's Marine Services. St. Catharines, Ontario: Vanwell Publishing Limited. ISBN 1-55125-070-5.
