= Barbara Foss =

North American tugboat

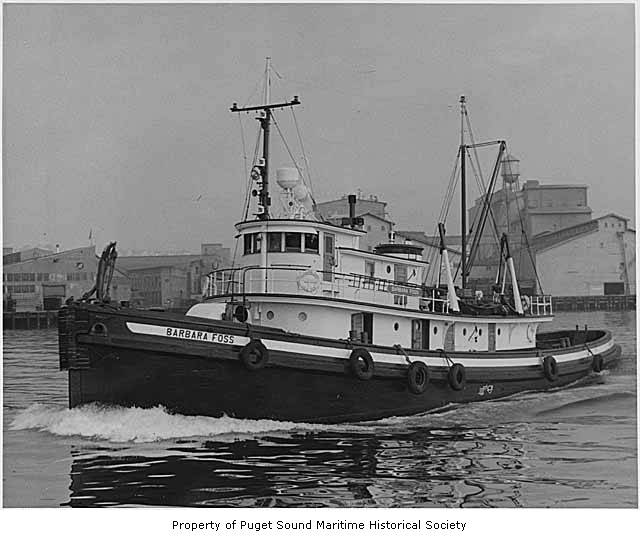

The Barbara Foss is an ocean-going tugboat operated by Foss Marine on North America's Pacific Ocean coast.

The vessel is homeported in Neah Bay, Washington.

In October 2014 the vessel was called upon to bring a crippled Russian container ship, the MV Simushur safely to port. The Simushur engines had failed, leaving her adrift near environmentally sensitive Haida Gwaii. Initially the Simushur had been taken in tow by the CCGS Gordon Reid, a patrol vessel of the Canadian Coast Guard that had been able to prevent the vessel from running aground, but lacked the horsepower to bring her to port.

The Barbara Foss's regular duties had been towing barges to and from Alaska. At the time the Simushur lost power the Barbara Foss had just finished towing barges to nearby Prince Rupert.
