= ArcticNet =

Network of Centres of Excellence of Canada

ArcticNet is a Network of Centres of Excellence of Canada. Its objective is to study the impacts of climate change and modernization in the coastal Canadian Arctic.

ArcticNet was founded in December 2003. ArcticNet also manages the Arctic Inspiration Prize on a voluntary basis.

The governance structure includes a board of directors who oversee two divisions: (1) the science programme, led by an Inuit Advisory Committee and a Territorial Advisory Committee, to whom the Scientific Director reports, and (2) the network administration overseen by an Executive Director.

Past board members include Sheila Watt-Cloutier. Former President of the Inuit Circumpolar Council. Current board members include Professor Jackie Dawson and Cedar Swan CEO of Adventure Canada.

== ArcticNet Scientific Publications ==
Since the beginning of its activities in 2003, ArcticNet researchers have published more than 1,000 peer-reviewed scientific publications and 2,300 other publications. The total contributions of ArcticNet researchers – presentations, publications and other communications exceeds 3,700.

The ArcticNet Publications Database includes publications from the ArcticNet, Canadian Arctic Shelf Exchange Study (CASES) and International North Water Polynya Study (NOW) research projects. It provides complete coverage of more than 2,400 peer-reviewed publications and partial coverage of over 800 other publications.

== Core research program ==
In addition to field work undertaken in northern communities, ArcticNet researchers use the Canadian Coast Guard research icebreaker CCGS Amundsen to access the coastal Arctic.

== Education and training ==
From the very beginning, ArcticNet has been implementing a comprehensive training strategy to recruit and train new generations of researchers and technicians, critical for documenting and studying the transformation of the Canadian North. Over 600 students and postdoctoral fellows have completed or are completing their training within the unique and international context of ArcticNet.

== Schools on Board ==
Schools on Board is an outreach program initiated in the first year of ArcticNet. It bridges the gap between Arctic science taught in the classroom and research conducted in the field. The main activity of Schools on Board is the field trip 'on board' the CCGS Amundsen where students and teachers have the unique opportunity to participate in an educational experience fully integrated into the research activities of the ArcticNet teams. In 2013, building on the success of Schools on Board, a pilot program called Schools on Tundra was launched, with its first field trip hosted at the Churchill Northern Studies Centre (CNSC) in Churchill, Manitoba, Canada.

== Meetings ==
ArcticNet organizes regular meetings, conferences and workshops. Network members gather once a year at the ArcticNet Annual Scientific Meeting (ASM).

== See also ==
- Climate change
