= Polaris mine =

Zinc mine in Nunavut, Canada

Polaris Mine
- Location in Canada
- Location: Little Cornwallis Island, Nunavut (Northwest Territories), Canada; 75°23′40″N 096°52′50″W
- Products: Lead; Zinc
- Production: 21,000,000 tonnes (ore)
- Financial year: Life of mine
- Opened: 1981
- Closed: 2002
- Company: Cominco
- Acquired: 1964

Polaris zinc mine was a former underground mine on Little Cornwallis Island in the Canadian territory of Nunavut (Northwest Territories prior to Nunavut's official separation). The zinc mine was located 1,120 km (700 mi) north of the Arctic Circle, and 96 km (60 mi) north of the community of Resolute. It closed in July 2002 following more than twenty years of zinc production.

== History ==
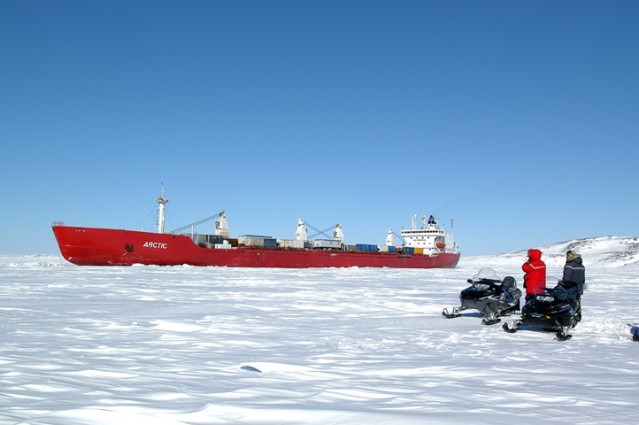
The MV Arctic hauled ore from the Polaris mine

In 1964 Vancouver-based Cominco optioned all the mineral claims in Canada's Arctic that were controlled by Bankeno Mines. Mineral and economic assessments resulted in a 23 million ton reserve at a zinc grade of 14.1 per cent. Approval of the project was obtained in 1979, then Prime Minister Joe Clark waived environmental assessment hearings and pledged to ship half of the concentrate from the mine in the federally owned icebreaker MV Arctic. The entire mineral processing plant, power plant and workshop were built upon a barge and travelled 5,600 km (3,500 mi) from Quebec to the mine site. In 1981 the mine commenced production. The Polaris mine employed over 250 people. Although only 20 mine employees were from northern Canada, thirty percent of employment in Resolute was directly related to the mine.

== Production ==
The Polaris mine produced over 21 million tonnes of lead-zinc ore during the life of the mine, with a market value of over $1.5 billion. Concentrate from the mining operation was stored in a 210 m (700 ft) long warehouse, which was the largest structure in Nunavut.

== Closure ==
Initially the mine was scheduled to close in 2001, however due to improved mining techniques, the mine life was extended one year to 2002. Reclamation procedures following the closure of the Polaris mine set a new standard for mine closure in the territory of Nunavut. Reclamation of the mine site began while the mine was still operating, this work was planned to ensure it would not have an adverse effect on the mining operation (such as removal of unused buildings). Cominco intended to bury most of the buildings and materials in a nearby quarry, with the permafrost preventing contamination. Cominco offered the staff accommodations to the federal government for use as a penal colony on the island. Household items were offered to residents of nearby Inuit communities. Cleanup of the Polaris mine site took two years, with environmental monitoring until 2011.

== See also ==
- Nanisivik Mine
