= Gabrielle Léger =

Canadian politician

Gabrielle Léger CC
- Born: Gabrielle Carmel; May 25, 1916; Montreal, Quebec, Canada
- Died: March 10, 1998 (aged 81)
- Known for: Viceregal consort of Canada
- Awards: Order of Canada

Gabrielle Léger CC (May 25, 1916 – March 10, 1998) was the wife of the 21st Governor General of Canada Jules Léger and was the Viceregal consort of Canada.

Born Gabrielle Carmel in Montreal, she was introduced to Jules Léger, a lawyer studying at the Sorbonne, by friends in 1937 while in Paris and they married on August 13, 1938. They had two daughters Francine and Helene. One of them died in May 1968.

Six months after being appointed Governor General in 1974, Jules Léger suffered a stroke. Gabrielle assisted in his rehabilitation by helping him to learn to speak and walk again. She also read the Governor General New Year's message in 1975 and became the first woman to read passages from the Speech from the Throne in 1976 when she read it along with Jules Léger.

Her contributions to her husband's term were recognized by her inclusion in Mr. Léger's official portrait, which hangs in the Entrance Hall at Rideau Hall. Gabrielle Léger was the first spouse to have been featured in a portrait along with the Governor General. The right honourable Michaëlle Jean`s husband Jean Daniel-Lafond is also included in her official portrait.

From 1979 to 1985, she was the Chancellor of the University of Ottawa. Gabrielle Léger was named co-president along with Cardinal Paul-Émile Léger of the Jules and Paul-Émile Léger Foundation when it was created by a special act of the Canadian Parliament in 1981.

In 1974, she was made a Companion of the Order of Canada as the "spouse of the twenty-first Governor General of Canada".

Honorary titles
| Preceded by Norah Michener | Viceregal Consort of Canada; 1974–1979 | Succeeded by Lily Schreyer |
Academic offices
| Preceded by Gérald Fauteux | Chancellor of the University of Ottawa; 1979–1985 | Succeeded by Maurice Sauvé |
