= Jackie Dawson =

Canadian academic

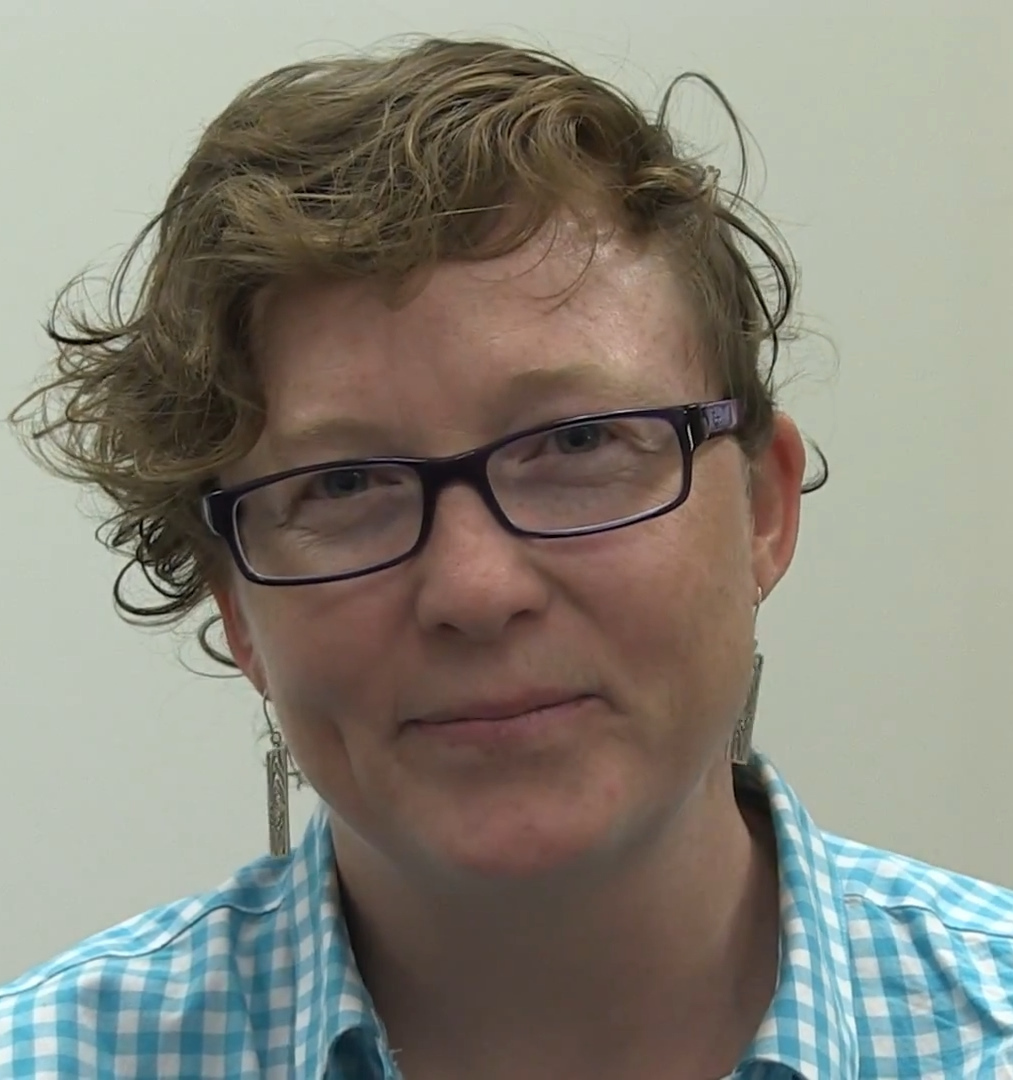
- Dawson in 2015
- Occupation: Academic at a public university: the University of Ottawa
- Known for: Research into arctic shipping and climate change, and ecotourism

Academic background
- Education: University of Waterloo University of Otago Lakehead University
- Thesis: Climate Change Vulnerability of the US Northeast Ski Sector (2009)

Academic work
- Discipline: Geography
- Website: https://www.jackiedawson.ca/

Jackie Dawson is a Canadian academic who holds the Canada Research Chair (Tier 2) in Environment, Society and Policy. Dawson is also co-Scientific Director of ArcticNet, where she is currently a member of the Board of Directors.

== Biography ==
Dawson graduated in 1997 from Barrie North Collegiate Institute in Barrie, Ontario, Canada. In 2019, she was inducted into the Barrie North Collegiate Institute Wall of Honour. Dawson completed a Master's in 2003 at the University of Otago, with a thesis on environmental values of marine tourists.

== Research ==
Dawson's research focuses on the impacts of Ecotourism in the Canadian arctic and sub-arctic, and also on how maritime shipping in a time of climate warming will affect the Canadian arctic, both terrestrial Inuit communities and culturally significant marine protected areas.

Dawson is a lead author on the Intergovernmental Panel on Climate Change 6th Assessment Report.

During the 2024 ArcticNet fifth International Arctic Change Conference, Dawson spoke about her research involving analyzed shipping season lengths from 2007 to 2021, finding that narrow passages were created when multi-year ice moved south from colder regions. This resulted in increases in ship traffic in Hudson Strait, Baffin Island, and Northwest Passage, and reduction in accident rates among commercial ships.

Dawson is a Researcher in Residence at Adventure Canada. Dawson was elected as a member of the College of the Royal Society of Canada in 2023, and selected as a 2024 Dorothy Killam Fellow by the Killam Trusts.

== Community service and leadership ==
Dawson is a member of the Global Young Academy, which aims to give "a voice to young scientists around the world."

Dawson's arctic research practice emphasizes collaboration with Inuit colleagues in communities across Nunavut and beyond. She serves as a member of the Council of Canadian Academies' (CCA) Scientific Advisory Committee, and has served as an expert panelist for two of CCA's reports: Commercial Marine Shipping Accidents: Understanding the Risks in Canada (2016), and The Value of Commercial Marine Shipping to Canada (2017).

In May 2021, the Arctic Corridors Research Project that Dawson leads, with colleagues, Natalie Carter, Natasha Simonee and Shirley Tagalik, received a Governor General's Innovation Award. The project "consulted with 14 northern communities — seven in Nunavut — to find out how to best protect culturally significant marine areas in the Arctic as ship traffic increases".

== Honours and awards ==
- 2021 Governor General of Canada's Innovation Awards
- 2020 Connection Award, Social Sciences and Humanities Research Council (SSHRC)
- 2017 Early Career Researcher of the Year Award, University of Ottawa
- 2016 Early Career Researcher of the Year Award, Faculty of Arts, University of Ottawa
- 2016 Member of the Royal Society of Canada's College of New Scholars, Artists and Scientists
- 2016 Elected Member of the Global Young Academy
- 2015 Fellow of the Royal Canadian Geographical Society
- 2015 Government of Ontario Early Researcher Award recipient

== Selected bibliography ==
- Jackie Dawson, Emma J. Stewart, Harvey Lemelin & Daniel Scott (2010) The carbon cost of polar bear viewing tourism in Churchill, Canada. Journal of Sustainable Tourism 18:3, 319–336, doi:10.1080/09669580903215147
- J. Dawson, M. J. Johnston, E. J. Stewart, C. J. Lemieux, R. H. Lemelin, P. T. Maher & B. S.R Grimwood (2011) Ethical considerations of last chance tourism. Journal of Ecotourism 10:3, 250–265. doi:10.1080/14724049.2011.617449
- J. Dawson, M.E. Johnston, E.J. Stewart (2014) Governance of Arctic expedition cruise ships in a time of rapid environmental and economic change. Ocean & Coastal Management 89: 88–99. doi:10.1016/j.ocecoaman.2013.12.005.
- Dawson, J., Pizzolato, L., Howell, S., Copland, L., & Johnston, M. (2018). Temporal and Spatial Patterns of Ship Traffic in the Canadian Arctic from 1990 to 2015. Arctic 71(1), 15–26.
- Huntington, Henry P., Julia Olsen, Eduard Zdor, Andrey Zagorskiy, Hyoung Chul Shin, Olga Romanenko, Bjørn Kaltenborn, Jackie Dawson, Jeremy Davies, and Erin Abou-Abbsi. "Effects of Arctic commercial shipping on environments and communities: Context, governance, priorities." Transportation Research Part D: Transport and Environment 118 (2023): 103731.
