= CCGS Gordon Reid =

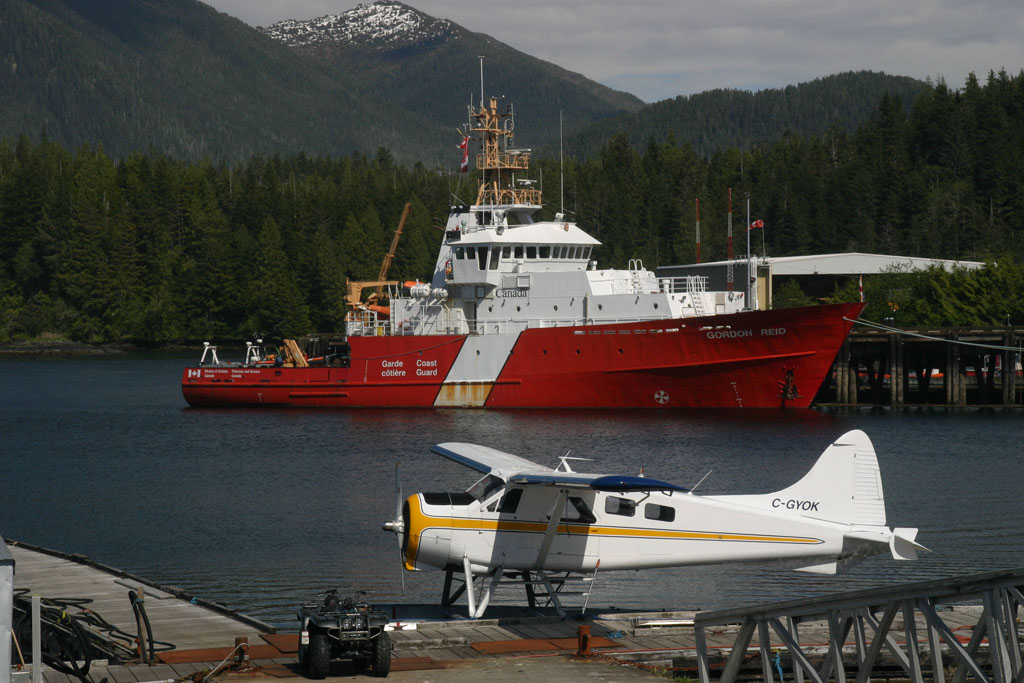
- Gordon Reid and de Havilland Canada DHC-2 Beaver seaplane moored at Prince Rupert, British Columbia.

History

Canada
- Name: Gordon Reid
- Namesake: Gordon Reid
- Operator: Canadian Coast Guard
- Port of registry: Ottawa, Ontario
- Builder: Versatile Pacific Shipyards, North Vancouver
- Yard number: 557
- Launched: 23 June 1990
- Completed: December 1991
- Commissioned: October 1990
- In service: 1990–present
- Home port: CCG Base Patricia Bay, Sidney, British Columbia
- Identification: CGBR; IMO number: 8818568
- Status: Ship in active service

General characteristics
- Type: Fisheries patrol vessel
- Tonnage: 879 GT; 257 NT
- Length: 50 m (164 ft 1 in)
- Beam: 11 m (36 ft 1 in)
- Draught: 5.4 m (17 ft 9 in)
- Propulsion: 4 × Deutz 628; 3,580 kW (4,800 hp)
- Speed: 16.5 knots (30.6 km/h; 19.0 mph)
- Range: 2,500 nmi (4,600 km; 2,900 mi) at 12 knots (22 km/h; 14 mph)
- Endurance: 28 days
- Complement: 14

CCGS Gordon Reid (Note: CCGS stands for Canadian Coast Guard Ship) is an offshore fisheries patrol vessel of the Canadian Coast Guard. The vessel entered service in 1990 on the West Coast of Canada and is still in active service. In 2014, Gordon Reid responded to the distress signal of MV Simushur which had lost engine power off the coast of Haida Gwaii in British Columbia.

== Design and description ==
Gordon Reid is 50 m (164 ft 1 in) long overall with a beam of 11 m (36 ft 1 in) and a draught of 5.4 m (17 ft 9 in). The vessel has an 879 gross tonnage (GT) and a 257 net tonnage (NT). The ship is powered by four Deutz 628 geared diesel engines driving two controllable pitch propellers and bow thrusters creating 3,580 kW (4,800 hp). The vessel is also equipped with one Mitsubishi 6D14T emergency generator. This gives the ship a maximum speed of 16.5 knots (30.6 km/h). Gordon Reid carries 148.20 m^{3} (32,600 imp gal) of diesel fuel, has a range of 2,500 nautical miles (4,600 km) at 12 knots (22 km/h) and can stay at sea for up to 28 days. The patrol vessel has a complement of 14 composed of 6 officers and 8 crew and has 8 spare berths.

== Service history ==
The vessel was constructed by Versatile Pacific Shipyards at their yard in Vancouver, British Columbia with the yard number 557. The ship entered service with the Canadian Coast Guard in October 1990 but was not completed until December 1991. Named for Gordon Reid, a British Columbian who was famous along the British Columbia Coast for his knowledge of the area, the ship is registered in Ottawa, Ontario but homeported at the Coast Guard base at Victoria, British Columbia.

Ordered by the Canadian Coast Guard to replace the older R-class cutters in the Western Region, Gordon Reid is used for fisheries patrol and search and rescue. In October 2014, the Russian container ship MV Simushur lost the use of its engines near environmentally sensitive Haida Gwaii. Gordon Reid was the first vessel to try to tow the disabled vessel to keep the container ship from running aground. However, Gordon Reid's own engines were not powerful enough. The American ocean-going tugboat Barbara Foss was dispatched from nearby Prince Rupert, British Columbia to tow the disabled Russian vessel. In November 2015, the American-flagged cargo ship North Star lost power while transiting from Anchorage, Alaska to Tacoma, Washington. Gordon Reid was deployed to aid the ship, but North Star managed to get her engines going again and arrived in port without assistance. In October 2020, Gordon Reid rescued two people from the sailboat Second Star after it lost steering in the Pacific Ocean.

== See also ==
- CCGS John Jacobson - sister ship
