= Lily Schreyer =

Canadian viceregal consort (born 1938)

Lily Schreyer, CC (née Schulz; c. 1938) is a former Viceregal consort of Canada, as the wife of former Manitoba premier and Governor General Edward Schreyer. They married June 30, 1960 and had two daughters, Lisa and Karmel, and two sons, Jason and Toban. She has been involved with Girl Guides of Canada, UNICEF and other charitable organizations. She and her husband were made Companions of the Order of Canada in 1979.

She has shown concern for issues related to the physically disabled. As Chatelaine of Rideau Hall she had an accessible entrance and an elevator installed, and suggested the Fountain of Hope, dedicated to Terry Fox, which stands in front of the main entrance.

Lily Schreyer is the sponsor of the CCGS Amundsen.

Her father, Jacob Schulz, was a Co-operative Commonwealth Federation Member of Parliament.

Honorary titles
Preceded by Gabrielle Léger	Viceregal Consort of Canada; 1979–1984	Succeeded by Maurice Sauvé
