= MV Arctic =

Icebreaking cargo ship built in 1978

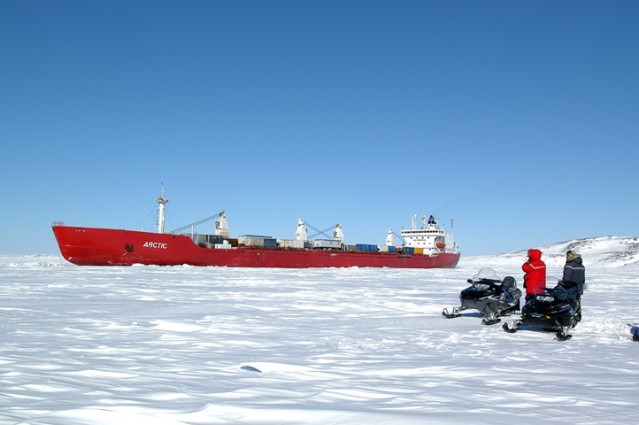
- MV Arctic at Voisey's Bay, Labrador, Canada

History
- Name: Arctic
- Owner: Fednav Group
- Operator: Fednav Limited
- Port of registry: Montreal, Quebec, Canada
- Builder: Port Weller Dry Docks, St. Catharines, Ontario, Canada
- Yard number: 63
- Completed: 1 June 1978
- In service: 1978–2021
- Identification: IMO number: 7517507; Call sign: VCLM; MMSI number: 316056000
- Fate: Broken up

General characteristics (1978)
- Type: Ore-bulk-oil carrier
- Tonnage: 19,420 GT; 28,094 DWT
- Displacement: 39,057 tons
- Length: LOA 220.82 m (724.5 ft); LPP 196.6 m (645.0 ft)
- Draught: 10.9 m (35.8 ft)
- Ice class: CAC 2
- Speed: 3–4 knots in 0.6 m (2.0 ft) ice

General characteristics (1986)
- Type: Ore-bulk-oil carrier
- Tonnage: 20,236 GT; 10,849 NT; 28,418 DWT (summer); 27,384 DWT (winter)
- Displacement: 39,427 tons
- Length: LOA 220.83 m (724.5 ft); LPP 206.0 m (675.9 ft)
- Beam: 22.92 m (75.2 ft)
- Draught: 11.52 m (37.8 ft) (summer); 10.67 m (35.0 ft) (winter)
- Depth: 15.2 m (49.9 ft)
- Ice class: 1A Super; Canada ASPPR Arctic Class 3; CAC 4 equivalent
- Installed power: 10.9 MW
- Propulsion: Ducted CPP, ⌀ 5.23 m (17.16 ft)
- Speed: 15 knots (28 km/h; 17 mph) in open water; 2 knots (3.7 km/h; 2.3 mph) in 1.5 m (4.9 ft) ice
- Capacity: 7 holds; 34,522 m^{3} (grain); 24,309 m^{3} (oil at 96 %)

Arctic was an icebreaking combination carrier built in 1978 at the Port Weller Dry Docks in St. Catharines, Ontario, Canada. The ship was owned and operated by the Fednav Group. Arctic was sold for recycling in Aliağa, Turkey in April 2021.

Designed to carry both oil and ore, the vessel is not only ice strengthened with a Finnish-Swedish ice class 1A Super, but has a CASPPR Class 3 or CAC 4 rating. This means it is powerful enough to navigate through many ice-covered waters without escort. Arctic previously serviced mines in the high Canadian Arctic such as Polaris and Nanisivik Mine. Once those mines closed she was shifted to service the Raglan mine in northern Quebec and the Voisey's Bay mine in Labrador. In addition in 1985 she became the first ship to export crude oil from the Canadian Arctic, from Panarctic Oils Bent Horn terminal.

As part of the repairs following a grounding off of Little Cornwallis Island the ice strengthening in the sides and bottom was increased at Thunder Bay shipyard in 1984. In 1985-1986 in anticipation of the export of crude oil from Bent Horn Island in the high Arctic the ship received a new icebreaker bow and was converted to an OBO at Port Weller Drydock. This improved her icebreaking capability such that the ice class could be upgraded from CAC 2 to CAC 4.
