= Voisey's Bay =

Bay in eastern Canada

Coordinates: 56°15′13″N 61°51′30″W

Voisey's Bay

Voisey's Bay is a bay of the Atlantic Ocean in Labrador, Canada. The bay is located 38 kilometres (24 mi) south of the community of Nain. The bay is heavily indented with numerous inlets and islands and is extremely rocky. It is the site of the Voisey's Bay Mine.

There is a village called Voisey in France.
