= Canadian Coast Guard ship =

Prefix applied to vessels in the Canadian Coast Guard

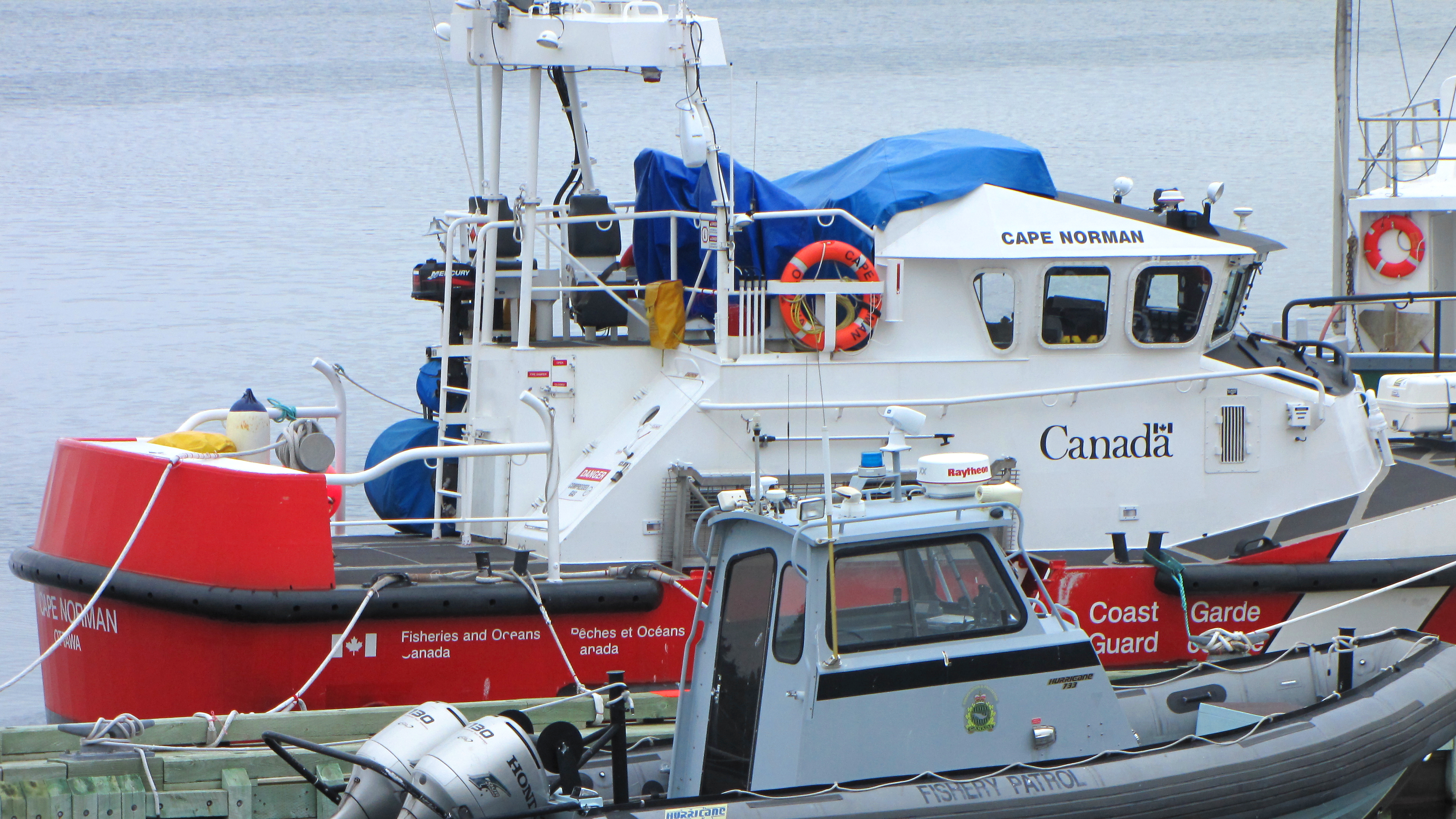
CCGS Cape Norman, SAR vessel, Port au Choix

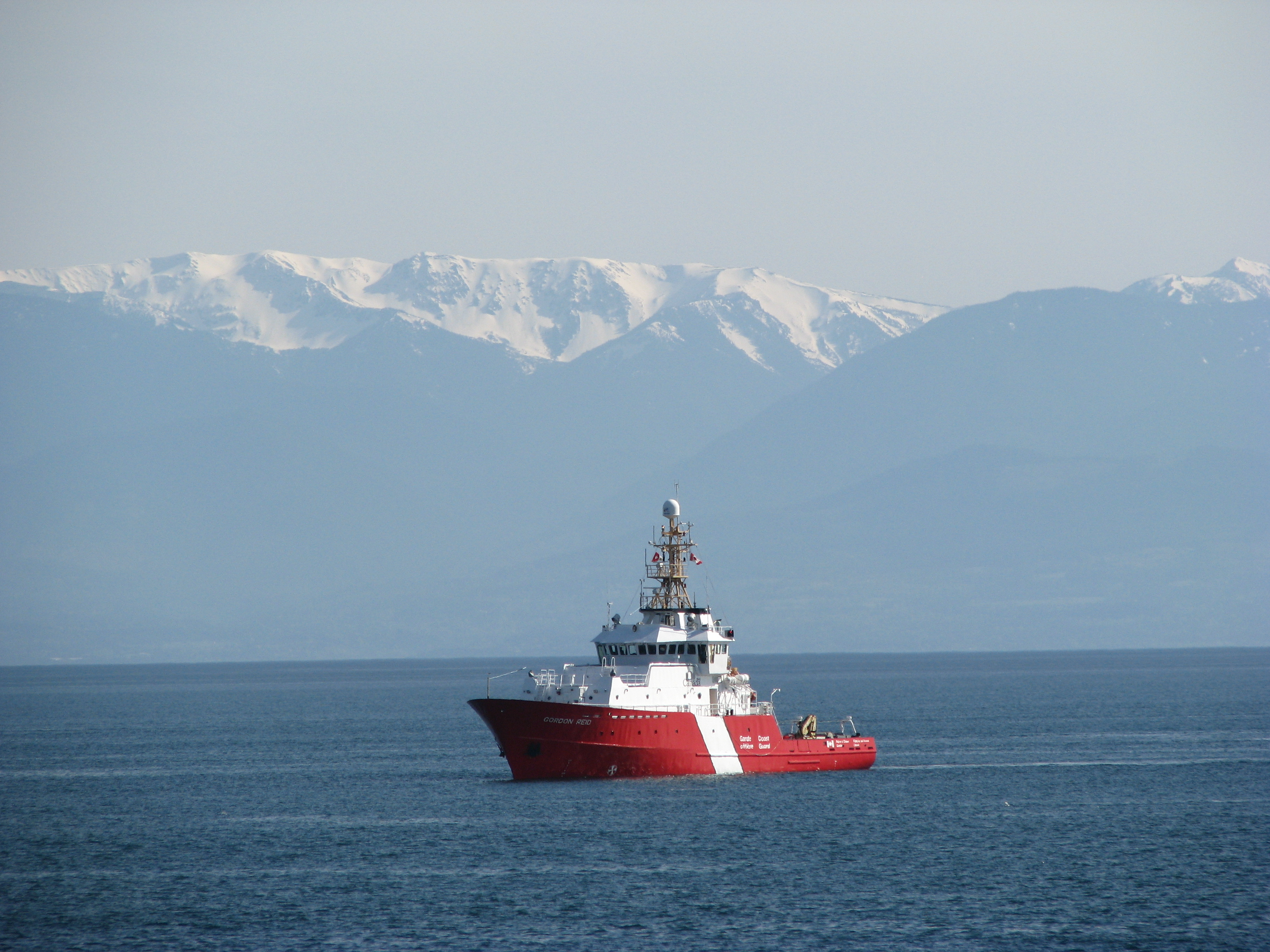
CCGS Gordon Reid off Ross Bay

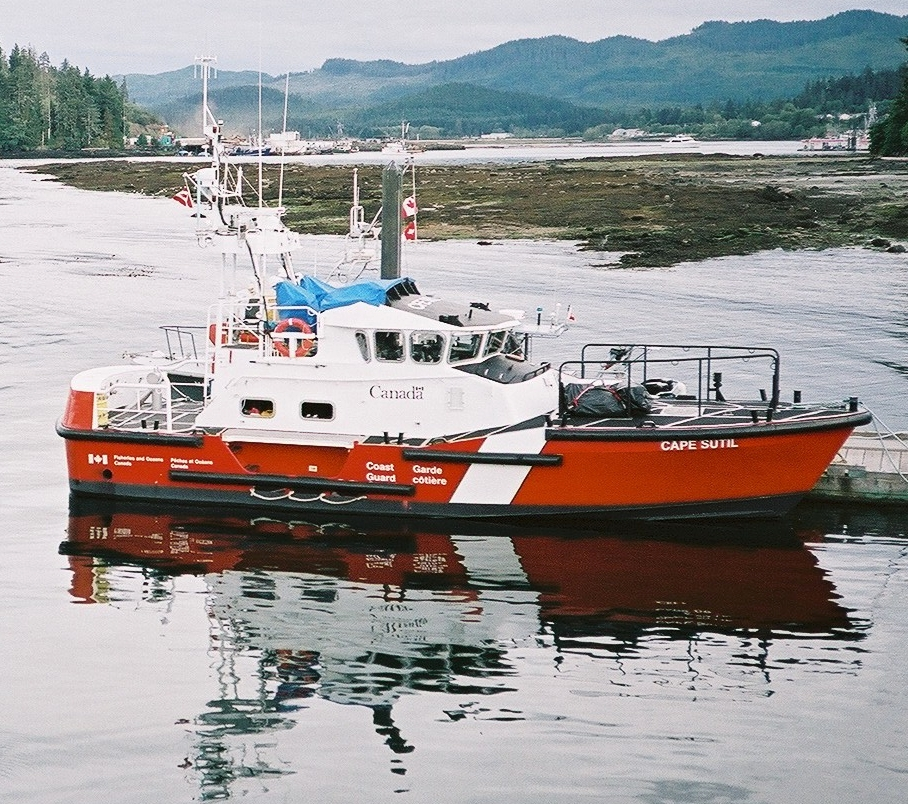
CCGS Cape Sutil at Port Hardy

The designation Canadian Coast Guard Ship (CCGS; French: navire de la Garde côtière canadienne, NGCC) is applied as a prefix to vessels in the Canadian Coast Guard.

Prior to the formation of the Coast Guard in the 1960s ships operated by the Canadian Department of Fisheries and Oceans (now known as Fisheries and Oceans Canada) were named with either the CGS prefix for Canadian Government Ship (Le CGS in French) or DGS for Dominion Government Ship.

== See also ==
- Equipment of the Canadian Coast Guard lists vessels of the Coast Guard
- His Majesty's Canadian Ship or HMCS a prefix used by the Royal Canadian Navy
