= Martha L. Black-class icebreaker =

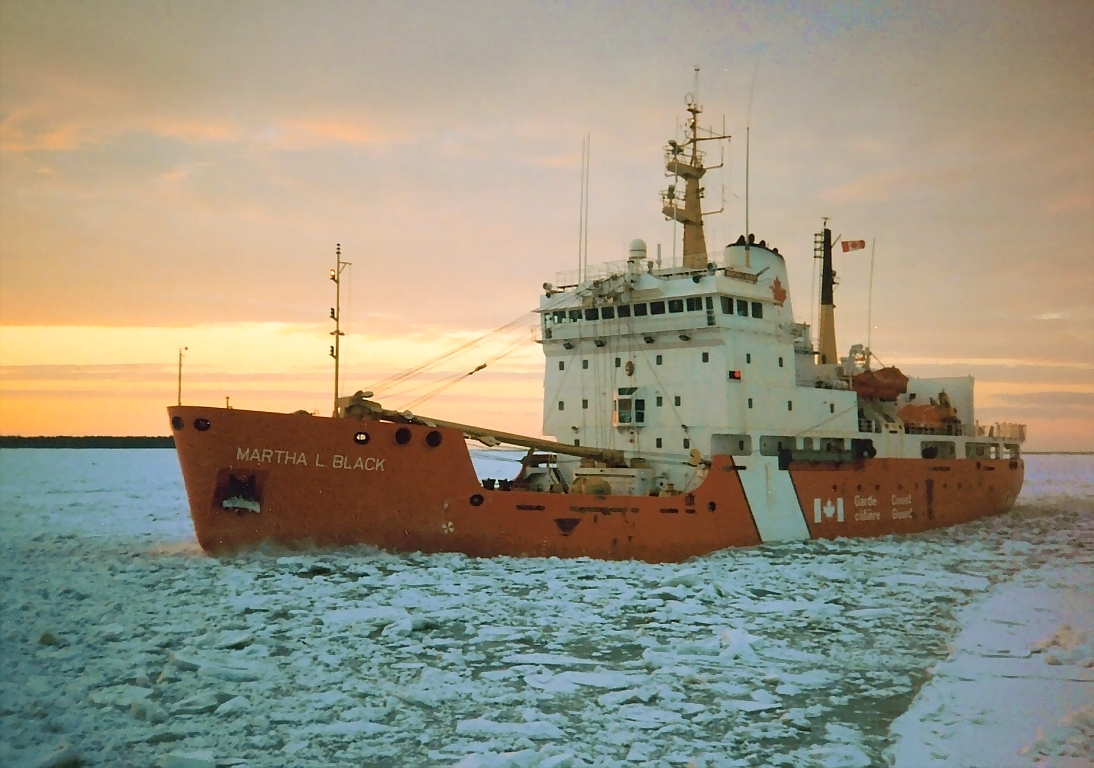
- Name ship of the class Martha L. Black entering the port of Rimouski

Class overview
- Name: Martha L. Black class
- Builders: Various
- Operators: Canadian Coast Guard
- Built: 1985–1986
- In service: 1986–present
- Completed: 6
- Active: 6

General characteristics for George R. Pearkes
- Type: Light icebreaker (CCG) and buoy tender
- Tonnage: 3,809.1 GT; 1,517.3 NT
- Displacement: 4,662 long tons (4,737 t) full load
- Length: 83 m (272 ft 4 in)
- Beam: 16.2 m (53 ft 2 in)
- Draught: 6 m (19 ft 8 in)
- Ice class: Arctic Class 2
- Installed power: 3 × ALCO 251F-16V
- Propulsion: Diesel electric
- Speed: 15 knots (28 km/h; 17 mph)
- Range: 14,500 nmi (26,900 km) at 11 knots (20 km/h; 13 mph)
- Endurance: 150 days
- Boats & landing craft carried: 1 × self-propelled barge
- Complement: 25
- Aircraft carried: 1 × Bell 429 Global Ranger or 1 × Bell 412EPI helicopter
- Aviation facilities: Hangar and flight deck

The Martha L. Black-class icebreakers are a class of six light icebreaker and buoy tenders constructed for and operated by the Canadian Coast Guard. Built in the 1980s, the class operates on both coasts of Canada and have been used for operations in the Arctic region, including the search for the ships of Franklin's lost expedition. They are rated as "high endurance multi-tasked vessels" under Canadian Coast Guard naming rules.

== Design and description ==
All vessels in the class displace 4,662 long tons (4,737 t) fully loaded and are 83.0 metres (272 ft 4 in) long overall with a beam of 16.2 metres (53 ft 2 in) and a draught of 5.8 metres (19 ft 0 in). The vessels have varying commercial tonnages; George R. Pearkes has a 3,809.1 gross tonnage (GT) and a 1,517.3 net tonnage (NT); Martha L. Black has a gross tonnage of 3818.1 and a net tonnage of 1529.4; Sir Wilfrid Laurier has a gross tonnage of 3812.1 and a net tonnage of 1533.6; Ann Harvey has a gross tonnage of 3823 and a net tonnage of 1528; Sir William Alexander and Edward Cornwallis have a gross tonnage of 3727.2 and a net tonnage of 1503.0.

The vessels are propelled by two fixed pitch propellers and bow thrusters powered by three Alco 251F diesel-electric engines creating 8,847 horsepower (6,597 kW) and three Canadian GE generators producing 6 megawatts of AC power driving two Canadian GE motors creating 7,040 horsepower (5,250 kW). The ships are also equipped with one Caterpillar 3306 emergency generator. The speed of the vessels ranges from 15 to 16.5 knots (27.8 to 30.6 km/h; 17.3 to 19.0 mph). The vessels have varying diesel fuel capacity, ranging from Ann Harvey at 780 long tons (790 t) to George R. Pearkes and Martha L. Black at 1,086 long tons (1,103 t). The range of the vessels, based on speed and fuel capacity, is varied. The ships are certified as Arctic Class 2.

The icebreakers are equipped with one Racal Decca Bridgemaster navigational radar operating on the I band. Sir William Alexander and Kopit Hopson 1752 have one less deck in the superstructure. The ships are equipped with a flight deck and a hangar which originally housed light helicopters of the MBB Bo 105 or Bell 206L types, but in the 2010s, the Bell 429 GlobalRanger and Bell 412EPI were acquired by the Canadian Coast Guard to replace the older helicopters. Deck equipment varies between the ships, with some equipped with speedcranes capable of lifting up to 20 long tons (20 t) and a 980 m^{3} (35,000 cu ft) cargo hold. Some vessels carry a self-propelled barge. Ship's complements range from 25–27, with 10 officers and 15–17 crew. Additional berths range from 9 to 26 additional berths.

== Ships in class ==
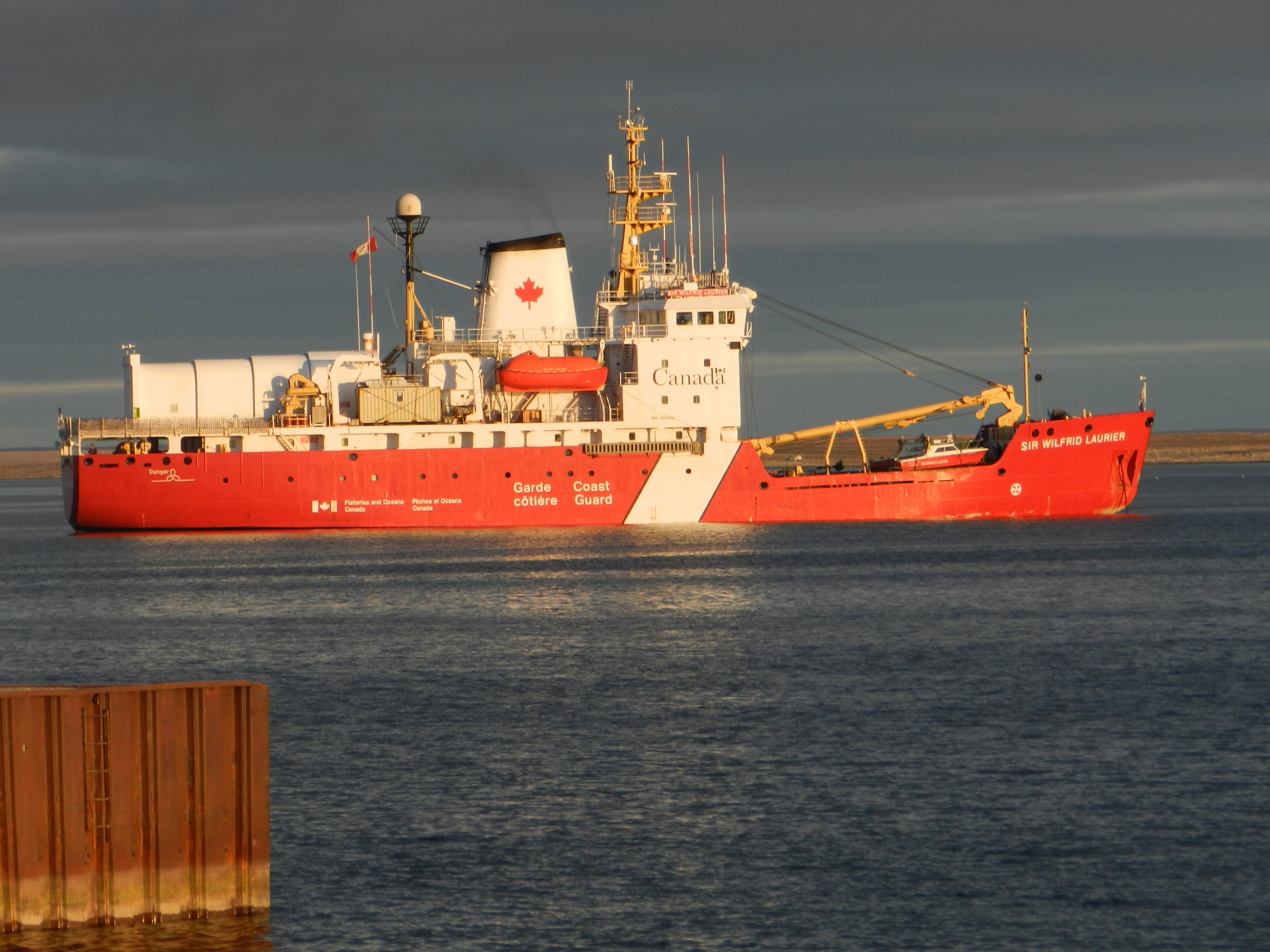
Sir Wilfrid Laurier in Cambridge Bay prior to departing to search for Franklin's lost expedition

Martha L. Black class construction data
Name	Builder	Launched	In service	Status
Martha L. Black	Versatile Pacific Shipyards Limited, North Vancouver, British Columbia	6 September 1985	30 April 1986	Active in service
George R. Pearkes	Versatile Pacific Shipyards Limited, North Vancouver, British Columbia	30 November 1985	17 April 1986	Active in service
Sir Wilfrid Laurier	Canadian Shipbuilding, Collingwood, Ontario	6 December 1985	15 November 1986	Active in service
Kopit Hopson 1752 (ex-Edward Cornwallis)	Marine Industries, Tracy, Quebec	24 February 1986	14 August 1986	Active in service
Sir William Alexander	Marine Industries, Tracy, Quebec	23 October 1986	13 February 1987	Active in service
Ann Harvey	Halifax Dartmouth Industries, Halifax, Nova Scotia	12 December 1985	29 June 1987	Active in service

== Operational history ==
The ships in the class all entered service in 1986–1987. The Canadian Coast Guard classifies all the ships in the class as "high endurance multi-tasked vessels" within their classification system. Martha L. Black and George R. Pearkes were assigned to the Western Region, based at Victoria, British Columbia. Sir Wilfrid Laurier was initially assigned to the Laurentian Region, home ported at Quebec City, Quebec. Ann Harvey was assigned to Newfoundland Region, based at St. John's, Newfoundland and Labrador and Edward Cornwallis and Sir William Alexander were assigned to the Maritimes Region, based at Dartmouth, Nova Scotia. Martha L. Black and Sir Wilfrid Laurier swapped places, while George R. Pearkes was reassigned first to Quebec City then to St. John's in 2004.

The vessels are used for buoy placement, retrieval and monitoring, scientific research, construction programs, search and rescue, icebreaking, and pollution control. They have been deployed on special missions, such as the 2005 operation to Louisiana by Sir William Alexander as part of Canada's aid to the United States following the devastation wrought by Hurricane Katrina. Sir Wilfrid Laurier deployed in 2014 as part of the search for John Franklin's ships, Erebus and Terror, during the Victoria Strait Expedition. Erebus was found during the search.

On 17 December 2007, Edward Cornwallis was dispatched to recover the 140-metre (459 ft 4 in) barge Houston carrying diesel fuel that had cast adrift in St. George's Bay near Port Hood, Nova Scotia. Facing 70 km/h (43 mph) winds and 5-metre (16 ft) waves, members of the crew boarded the barge. They rescued the crew and kept the barge from going aground until a tugboat arrived on 19 December. Five members of the crew were later awarded medals for their efforts. Sir William Alexander was involved in a fatal towing incident involving the fishing vessel L'Acadien II during the 2008 Canadian commercial seal hunt.

On 1 April 2015, Ann Harvey ran aground 5 nautical miles (9.3 km; 5.8 mi) southwest of Burgeo, Newfoundland and Labrador. The ship had been performing work on buoys when she hit bottom. A hole was torn in the hull and as she pulled back off the rocks, water flooded the motor propulsion room. The ship lost power and was towed to Connaigre Bay where temporary repairs were made. Ann Harvey was then towed to St. John's to undergo further repairs and refit. In March 2016, Canadian Coast Guard trials with the Schiebel Camcopter S-100 took place aboard George R. Pearkes off the Atlantic coast of Canada.

In 2021, due to the controversial history of Edward Cornwallis's initial namesake, Lieutenant General Edward Cornwallis, a British Army officer and founding governor of Halifax, Nova Scotia, the ship was renamed Kopit Hopson 1752 in consultation with indigenous peoples, to commemorate Jean-Baptiste Cope under his Mi'kmaq name, British Governor Peregrine Hopson, and the year of the peace and friendship treaty created by former Governor Edward Cornwallis.
