= CCGS Martha L. Black =

Canadian icebreaker

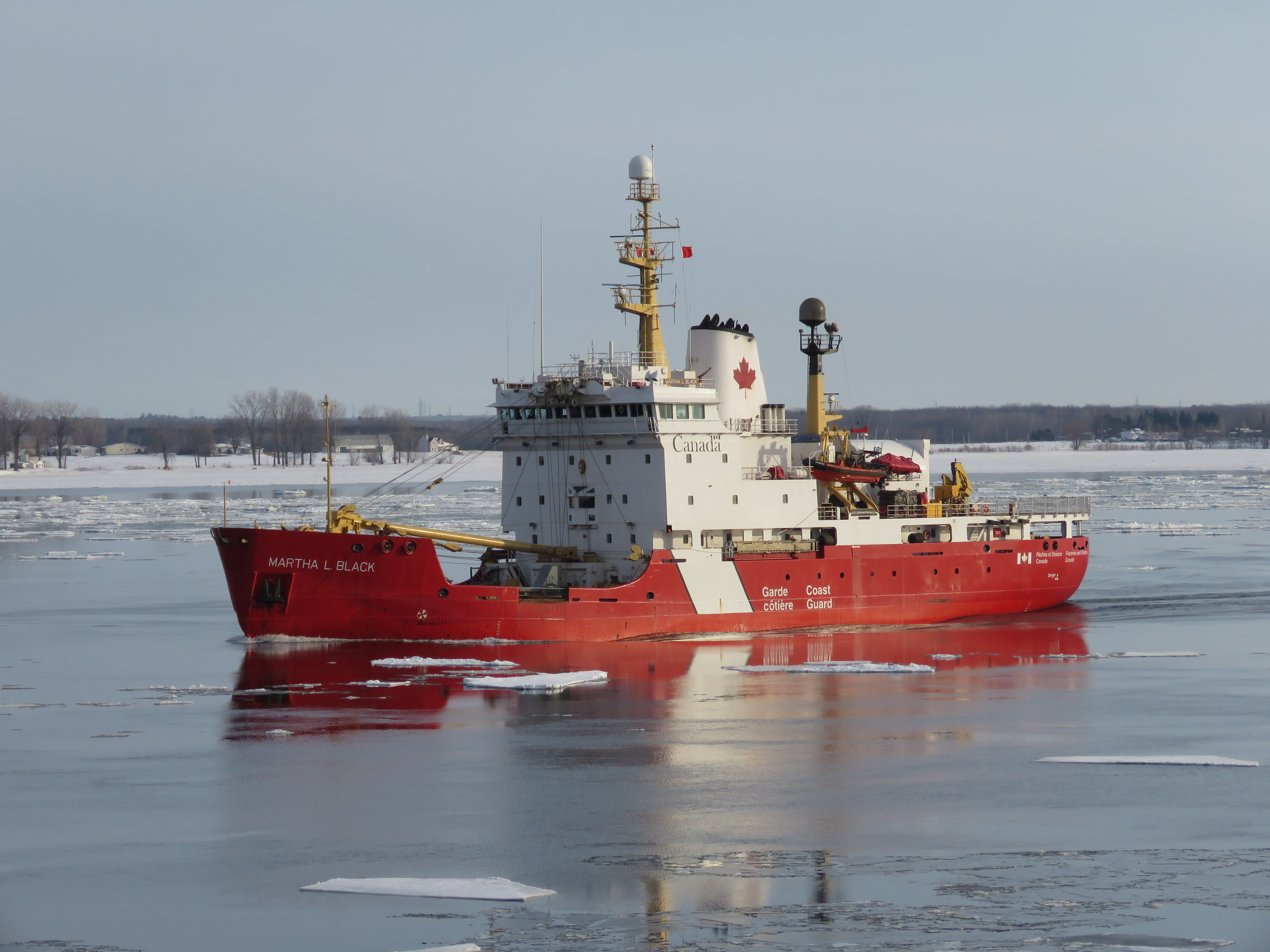
- CCGS Martha L. Black in Trois-Rivières, Quebec, Canada

History

Canada
- Name: CCGS Martha L. Black
- Namesake: Martha L. Black
- Operator: Canadian Coast Guard
- Port of registry: Ottawa, Ontario
- Builder: Versatile Pacific Shipyards, North Vancouver
- Yard number: 108
- Launched: 6 September 1985
- Commissioned: 30 April 1986
- Home port: CCG Base Quebec City, Quebec (Quebec Region)
- Identification: CGCC; IMO number: 8320432; MMSI number: 316039000
- Status: in active service

General characteristics
- Class & type: Martha L. Black-class icebreaker
- Tonnage: 3,818.1 GT; 1,529.4 NT
- Displacement: 4,662 long tons (4,737 t) full load
- Length: 83 m (272 ft 4 in)
- Beam: 16.2 m (53 ft 2 in)
- Draught: 6.1 m (20 ft 0 in)
- Ice class: CASPPR Arctic Class 2
- Propulsion: Diesel-electric AC – 3 x ALCO 251F 16-cylinder
- Speed: 15.1 knots (28.0 km/h; 17.4 mph)
- Range: 14,500 nmi (26,900 km; 16,700 mi) at 14 knots (26 km/h; 16 mph)
- Endurance: 120 days
- Boats & landing craft carried: 1 × self-propelled barge; 2 × rigid-hulled inflatable boats
- Complement: 25
- Sensors & processing systems: 1 × Racal Decca Bridgemaster navigational radar (I band)
- Aircraft carried: Originally 1 × MBB Bo 105 or Bell 206 B/L helicopter, currently 1 × Bell 429 GlobalRanger or Bell 412EPI
- Aviation facilities: Hangar and flight deck

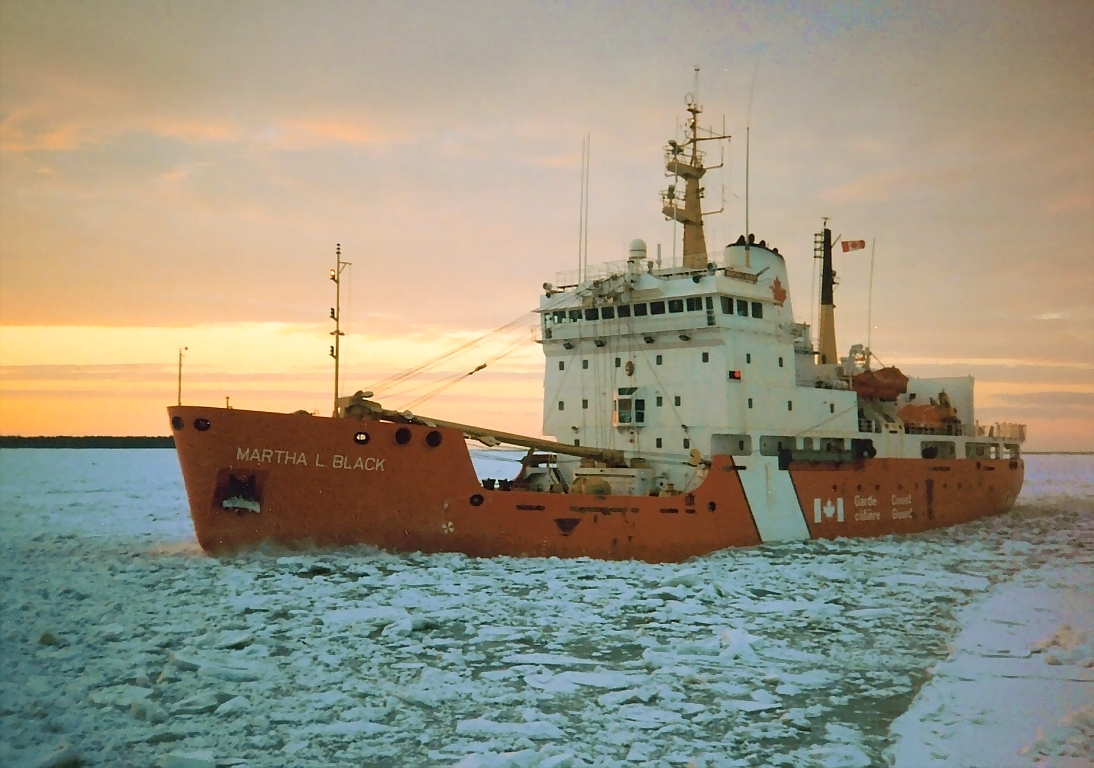
CCGS Martha L. Black entering Rimouski harbor

CCGS Martha L. Black is the lead ship of her class of light icebreakers of the Canadian Coast Guard. The ship was built in 1986 in Vancouver, British Columbia by Versatile Pacific Shipyards Limited as part of the CG Program Vessels. The vessel was mainly designed as a high-endurance, multi-tasked boat. Most of her duties are along the St. Lawrence River and St. Lawrence Seaway as she is able to handle the ice thickness there.

== Design and description ==
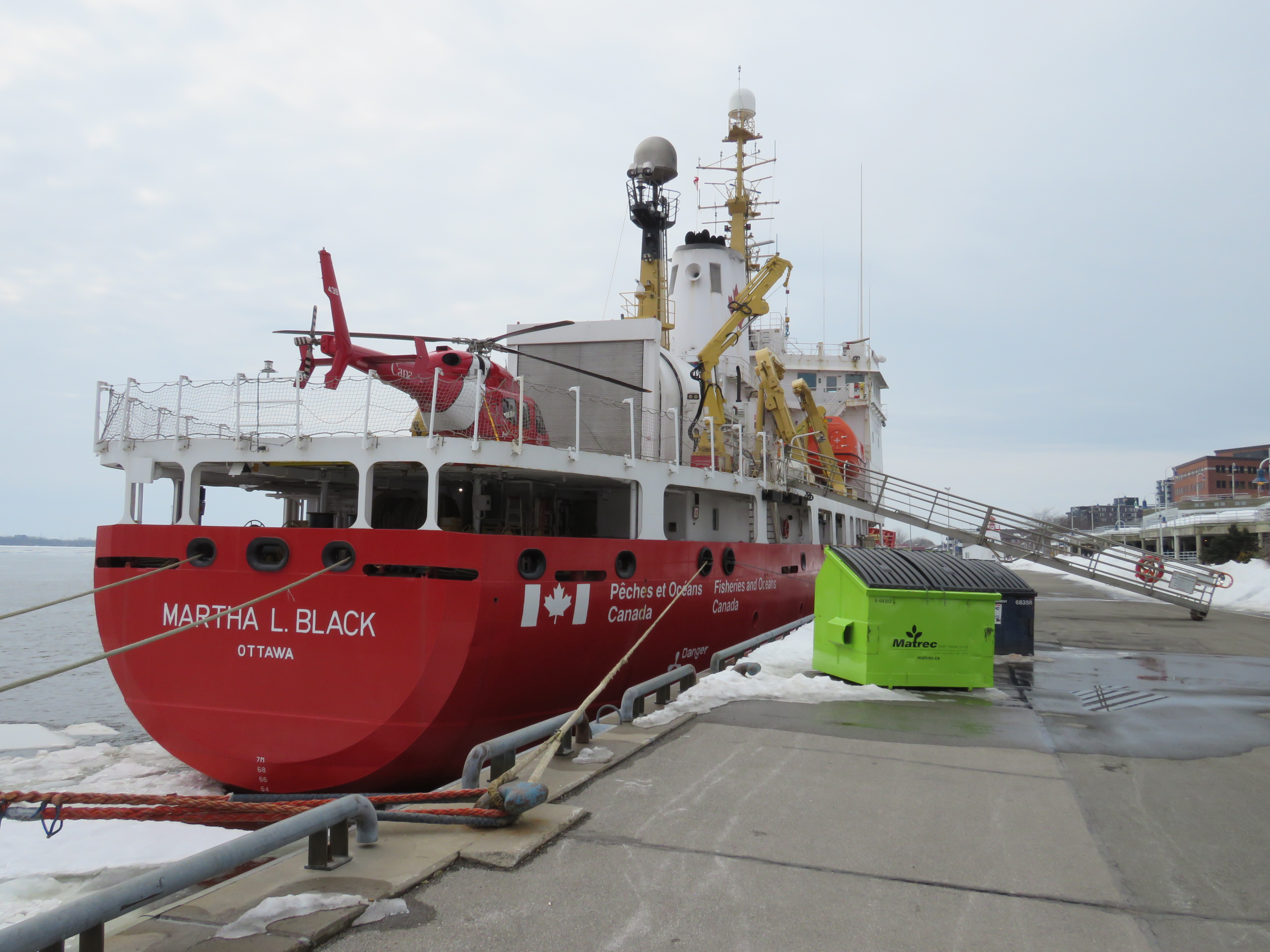
Bell 429 GlobalRanger on the deck of CCGS Martha L. Black at Trois-Rivières, Quebec, in March 2021

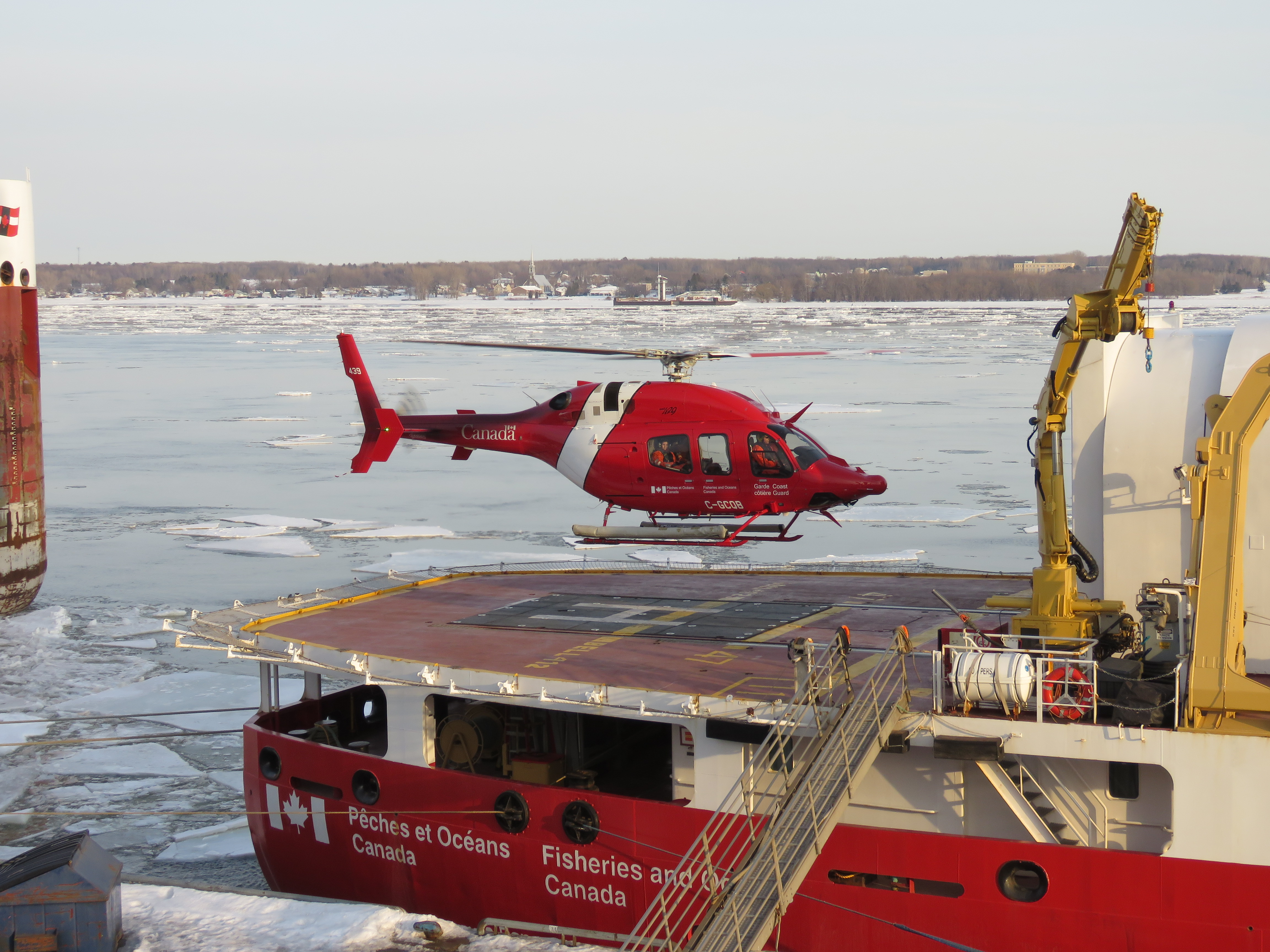
Bell 429 GlobalRanger landing on CCGS Martha L. Black with deck markings visible for both Bell 412 and Bell 429 operations

Martha L. Black, the lead ship of the Martha L. Black class of icebreakers, displaces 4,662 long tons (4,737 t) fully loaded with a 3,818.1 gross tonnage (GT) and a 1,529.4 net tonnage (NT). The ship is 83.0 metres (272 ft 4 in) long overall with a beam of 16.2 metres (53 ft 2 in) and a draught of 5.8 metres (19 ft 0 in).

The vessel is powered by two fixed-pitch propellers and bow thrusters powered by three Alco 251F diesel-electric engines creating 8,847 horsepower (6,597 kW), and three Canadian GE generators producing 6 megawatts of AC power driving two Canadian GE motors creating 7,040 horsepower (5,250 kW). The ship is also equipped with one Caterpillar C32 auxiliary generator and one Caterpillar 3306 emergency generator. This gives the ship a maximum speed of 15.1 knots (28.0 km/h; 17.4 mph). Capable of carrying 1,086 long tons (1,103 t) of diesel fuel, Martha L. Black has a maximum range of 14,500 nautical miles (26,900 km; 16,700 mi) at a cruising speed of 14 knots (26 km/h; 16 mph) and can stay at sea for up to 120 days. The ship is certified as Arctic Class 2.

The icebreaker is equipped with one Racal Decca Bridgemaster navigational radar operating on the I band. Martha L. Black has a crane capable of lifting 20 long tons (20 t). The ship carries two rigid-hulled inflatable boats and a self-propelled barge. Martha L. Black is equipped with a 195 m^{2} (2,100 sq ft) flight deck and a 103 m^{2} (1,110 sq ft) hangar which originally housed light helicopters of the MBB Bo 105 or Bell 206L types, but in the 2010s, the Bell 429 GlobalRanger and Bell 412EPI were acquired by the Canadian Coast Guard to replace the older helicopters. The ship can carry 22.8 m^{3} (5,000 imp gal) of aviation fuel for the helicopters. The ship has a complement of 25, with 10 officers and 15 crew. Martha L. Black has 26 additional berths. (Note: The description of the vessel is summarised from conflicting data. The Canadian Coast Guard claims the vessel displaces 5,028.8 metric tons (4,949.4 long tons) and has a cruising speed of 13 knots (24 km/h; 15 mph). Saunders claims the maximum speed of the vessel is 15.5 knots (28.7 km/h; 17.8 mph) and that Martha L. Black has a range of 6,500 nautical miles (12,000 km; 7,500 mi) at 15 knots (28 km/h; 17 mph).)

== Service history ==
Constructed by Versatile Pacific Shipyards Limited at their yard in North Vancouver, British Columbia with the yard number 108, the vessel was launched on 6 September 1985. The ship entered service on 30 April 1986. The ship was named for Martha L. Black, a woman from Chicago, Illinois who immigrated to Canada and was a pioneering settler of Yukon. She became the second woman to be elected a Member of Parliament in Canada in 1935. The ship is registered in Ottawa, Ontario, and homeported at Quebec City. The vessel was initially assigned to the Western Region, but swapped places with sister ship CCGS Sir Wilfrid Laurier.

The ship's primary duty is a buoy tender and navigational aids support in the Saint Lawrence River and Seaway and Saguenay River. Martha L. Black also provides icebreaking services to the same areas. In 2012, the ship transported scientists on a research mission to the Labrador Sea. In January 2014, Martha L. Black was one of two icebreakers called into the Saint Lawrence River to aid two passenger ferries which were prevented from crossing the river by ice. The ferries, which connect the Quebec communities of Sorel-Tracy and Saint-Ignace-de-Loyola, had been docked after ice conditions had become severe enough that the large icebreaker CCGS Amundsen needed reinforcement.

In 2016, Martha L. Black suffered damage to her three engines and remained out of service for three months, docked at Cacouna, Quebec.
