= CCGS Ann Harvey =

Canadian Coast Guard buoy tender and SAR ship

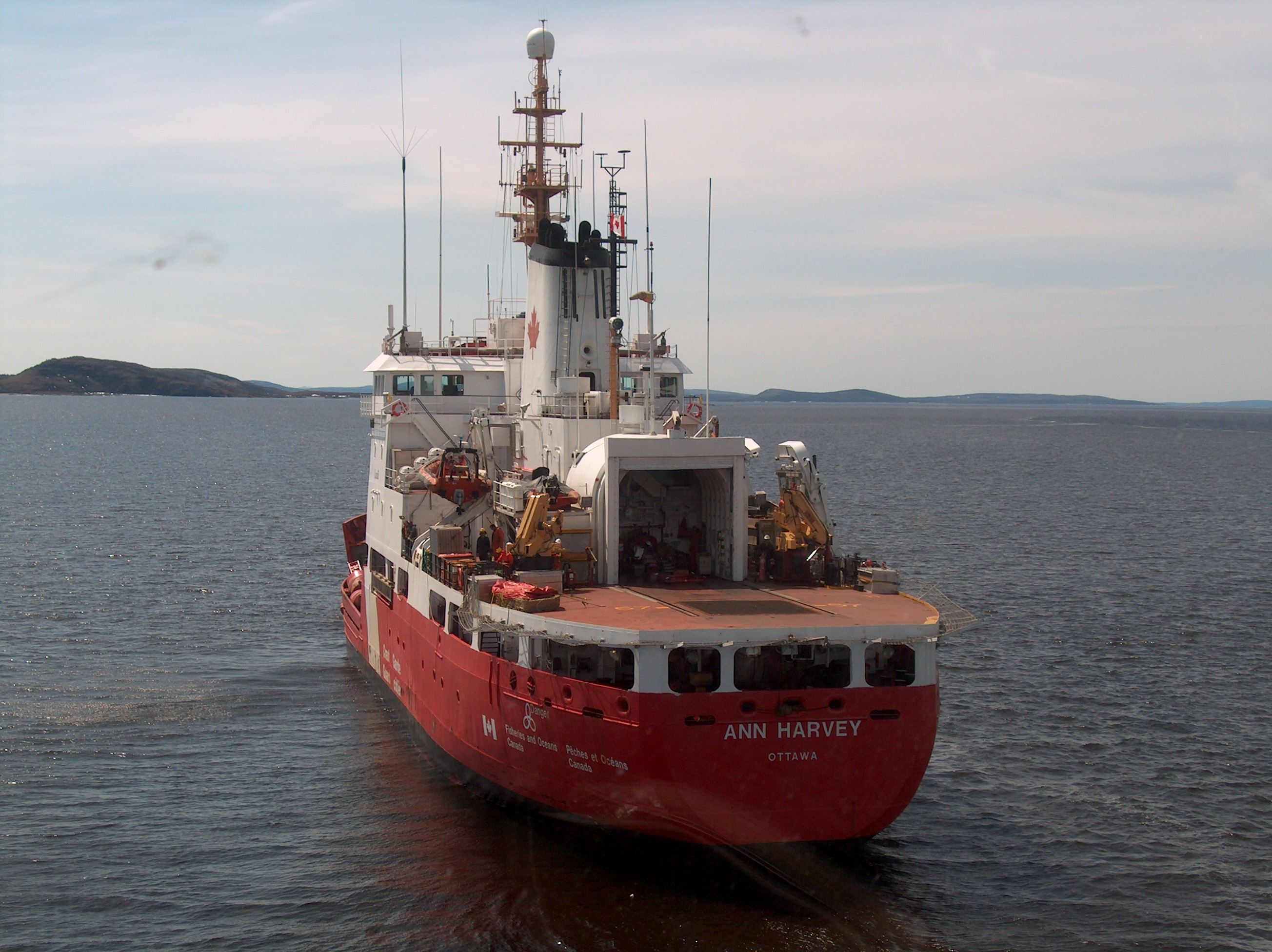
- The stern of CCGS Ann Harvey

History

Canada
- Name: Ann Harvey
- Namesake: Ann Harvey, noted Newfoundland fisher and heroine (1811–1860)
- Operator: Canadian Coast Guard
- Port of registry: Ottawa, Ontario
- Builder: Halifax Dartmouth Industries, Halifax
- Yard number: 72
- Launched: 12 December 1985
- Commissioned: 29 June 1987
- In service: 1987–present
- Home port: CCG Base St. John's (Newfoundland and Labrador Region)
- Identification: CGAH; IMO number: 8320468
- Status: in active service

General characteristics
- Class & type: Martha L. Black-class buoy tender and SAR vessel with Light icebreaker role
- Tonnage: 3,853.6 GT; 1,528 NT
- Displacement: 4,642 long tons (4,716 t)
- Length: 83 m (272 ft 4 in)
- Beam: 16.2 m (53 ft 2 in)
- Draught: 6.22 m (20 ft 5 in)
- Ice class: CASPPR Arctic Class 2
- Propulsion: Diesel electric 3 × Alco 251-16V engine, 8,847 hp (6,597 kW); 780 long tons (790 t) of fuel
- Speed: 12 knots (22 km/h; 14 mph) (cruise); 16.5 knots (30.6 km/h; 19.0 mph) (maximum)
- Range: 8,200 nautical miles (15,200 km; 9,400 mi)
- Endurance: 120 days
- Boats & landing craft carried: 1 – FRC Zodiac RHI (Crane); 2 – Hurricane 440 Zodiac (Miranda Davit); 3 – SP Barge (Davits)
- Complement: 24
- Aircraft carried: 1 × Bell 429 GlobalRanger helicopter
- Aviation facilities: Hangar to house two helicopters

CCGS Ann Harvey is a Canadian Coast Guard buoy tender and SAR vessel with light icebreaker duties. She was constructed in 1987 by Halifax Dartmouth Industries, in Halifax, Nova Scotia. The vessel was named after Ann Harvey, the daughter of a local Newfoundland fisherman who helped rescue 185 people during her lifetime. Ann Harvey's home port is St. John's, Newfoundland and Labrador and is stationed there with other Coast Guard ships.

== Design and description ==
The final ship of the Martha L. Black class, the vessel carries a boom, skimmer and environmental response equipment. Ann Harvey displaces 4,642 long tons (4,716 t) fully loaded, has a 3,823 gross tonnage (GT) and a 1,528 net tonnage (NT). The ship is 83 metres (272 ft 4 in) long overall with a beam of 16.2 metres (53 ft 2 in) and a draught of 6.22 metres (20 ft 5 in).

Ann Harvey is propelled by two fixed-pitch propellers and bow thrusters powered by three Alco 251-16V diesel-electric engines creating 8,847 horsepower (6,597 kW) and three Canadian GE generators producing 6 megawatts of AC power driving two Canadian GE motors creating 7,040 horsepower (5,250 kW). The ship is also equipped with one Caterpillar 3306 emergency generator. This gives the ship a maximum speed of 16.5 knots (30.6 km/h; 19.0 mph). (Note: Saunders states the speed as 15 knots (28 km/h; 17 mph).) Capable of carrying 780 long tons (790 t) of diesel fuel, Ann Harvey has a maximum range of 8,200 nautical miles (15,200 km; 9,400 mi) and 6,500 nautical miles (12,000 km; 7,500 mi) at 15 knots (28 km/h; 17 mph) and can stay at sea for up to 120 days. The ship is certified as Arctic Class 2.

The vessel is equipped with one Racal Decca Bridgemaster navigational radar operating on the I band. Ann Harvey has a speed crane derrick capable of lifting 20 long tons (20 t) and two sea cranes capable of lifting 2.5 long tons (2.5 t). The ship carries a 6-metre (20 ft) rescue craft and a self-propelled barge. Ann Harvey is equipped with a flight deck and a hangar that originally housed light helicopters of the MBB Bo 105 or Bell 206L types, but in the 2010s, the Bell 429 GlobalRanger and Bell 412EPI were acquired by the Canadian Coast Guard to replace the older helicopters. However, the vessel is only allotted one helicopter. The ship has a complement of 26, with 10 officers and 16 crew. Ann Harvey has 23 additional berths.

== Service history ==
Constructed by Halifax Dartmouth Industries at their yard in Halifax, Nova Scotia with the yard number 72, Ann Harvey was launched on 12 December 1985. The vessel entered service with the Canadian Coast Guard on 29 June 1987, registered in Ottawa, Ontario. The vessel is assigned to the Newfoundland Region, homeported at St. John's, Newfoundland and Labrador.

On 1 April 2015, Ann Harvey ran aground 5 nautical miles (9.3 km; 5.8 mi) southwest of Burgeo, Newfoundland and Labrador. The ship had been performing work on buoys when it hit bottom. A hole was torn in the hull and as she pulled back off the rocks, water flooded the motor propulsion room. Some personnel were evacuated and CCGS Louis S. St-Laurent was sent to tow Ann Harvey to Connoire Bay. The ship had lost power when the motor propulsion room and the space aft of it were flooded.

The lifeboat CCGS W.G. George was the first ship to arrive on scene. W.G. George towed Ann Harvey to the west. At 1:30 a.m. Louis S. St-Laurent arrived and took over. Ann Harvey was towed to a spot west of Burgeo in Connaigre Bay, where Royal Canadian Navy divers working from HMCS Charlottetown, which was dispatched from Canadian Forces Base Halifax, inspected the ship's damage. Once temporary repairs were completed, the ship was towed to St. John's where permanent hull repairs were completed at NewDock St. John's Dockyard LTD.

While undergoing repairs in St. John's, it was decided by the Canadian Coast Guard to begin the ship's Vessel Life Extension refit. The electric propulsion motors were removed and sent to Burlington, Ontario for overhaul. The crew lounge, engineer offices and helicopter track were cut out of the ship in order to remove the motors. The refit should last until mid-2017.

In June 2023, Ann Harvey was among the Canadian Coast Guard ships that was deployed in the search efforts involved in the Titan submersible implosion.
