= CCGS Sir William Alexander =

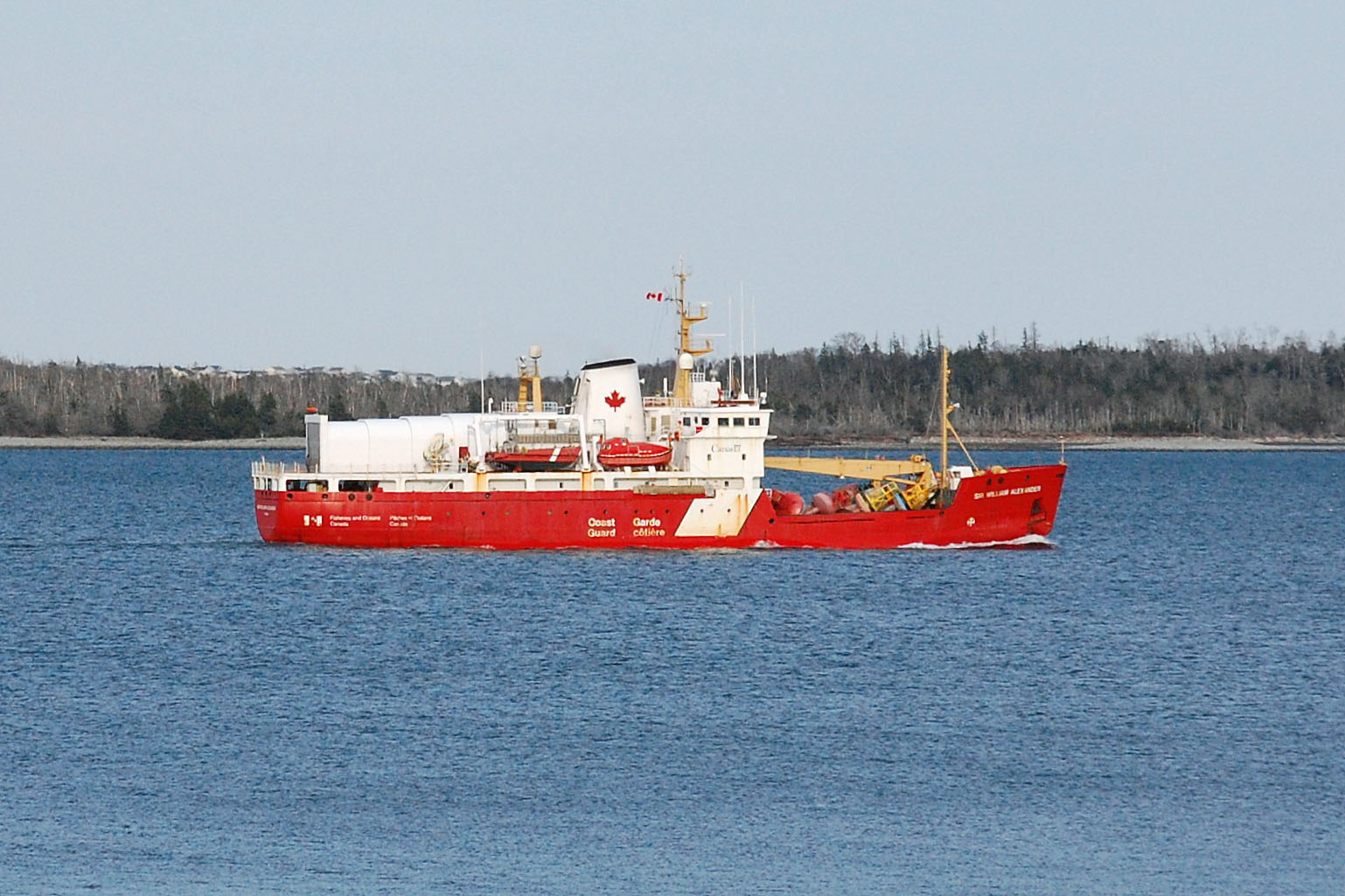
- CCGS Sir William Alexander near Halifax Harbour

History

Canada
- Name: Sir William Alexander
- Namesake: Sir William Alexander
- Operator: Canadian Coast Guard
- Port of registry: Ottawa
- Builder: MIL-Davie Shipbuilding, Sorel
- Yard number: 451
- Launched: 23 October 1986
- Commissioned: 13 February 1987
- In service: 1987–present
- Refit: 1998
- Home port: CCG Base Dartmouth (Maritime Region)
- Identification: Official number: 807685; IMO number: 8320482; Call sign: CGUM
- Status: in active service

General characteristics
- Class & type: Martha L. Black-class light icebreaker and buoy tender
- Tonnage: 3,727.2 GT; 1,503 NT
- Displacement: 4,662 long tons (4,737 t) full load
- Length: 83 m (272 ft 4 in)
- Beam: 16.2 m (53 ft 2 in)
- Draft: 5.8 m (19 ft 0 in)
- Ice class: CASPPR Arctic Class 2
- Propulsion: 3 × ALCO 251F diesel engines, 5,250 kW (7,040 hp); 2 × fixed pitch propellers; Bow thrusters
- Speed: 16 knots (30 km/h)
- Range: 6,500 nmi (12,000 km) at 13.7 knots (25.4 km/h)
- Endurance: 120 days
- Complement: 26
- Aircraft carried: Originally 1 × MBB Bo 105 or Bell 206L helicopter, currently 1 × Bell 429 GlobalRanger or Bell 412EPI
- Aviation facilities: Helicopter flight deck and hangar

CCGS Sir William Alexander (Note: CCGS stands for Canadian Coast Guard Ship) is a Martha L. Black-class light icebreaker. Entering service in 1987, the vessel is currently assigned to CCG Maritimes Region and is homeported at CCG Base Dartmouth, in Dartmouth, Nova Scotia. The vessel is named after Scottish explorer Sir William Alexander, 1st Earl of Stirling, who was an early colonizer of Nova Scotia.

== Description and design ==
Designed as a light icebreaker and buoy tender, Sir William Alexander and sister ship CCGS Edward Cornwallis differ from the rest of the class by having one less deck in the superstructure and their buoy-handling derricks mounted forward. Sir William Alexander had her derricks replaced by a crane in 1998. Sir William Alexander displaces 4,662 long tons (4,737 t) fully loaded with a 3,727.2 gross tonnage (GT) and a 1,503.0 net tonnage (NT). The ship is 83.0 metres (272 ft 4 in) long overall with a beam of 16.2 metres (53 ft 2 in) and a draught of 5.8 metres (19 ft 0 in).

The vessel is powered by is propelled by two fixed pitch propellers and bow thrusters powered by three Alco 251F diesel-electric engines creating 8,847 horsepower (6,597 kW) and three Canadian GE generators producing 6 megawatts of AC power driving two Canadian GE motors creating 7,040 horsepower (5,250 kW). The ship is also equipped with one Caterpillar 3306 emergency generator. This gives the ship a maximum speed of 16 knots (30 km/h). Capable of carrying 784.0 long tons (796.6 t) of diesel fuel, Sir William Alexander has a maximum range of 6,500 nautical miles (12,000 km) at a cruising speed of 13.7 knots (25.4 km/h) and can stay at sea for up to 120 days. The ship is certified as Arctic Class 2.

The icebreaker is equipped with one Racal Decca Bridgemaster navigational radar operating on the I band. The vessel is equipped a 980 m^{3} (35,000 cu ft) cargo hold. Sir William Alexander has a flight deck and hangar which originally accommodated light helicopters of the MBB Bo 105 or Bell 206L types, but in the 2010s, the Bell 429 GlobalRanger and Bell 412EPI were acquired by the Canadian Coast Guard to replace the older helicopters. The ship has a complement of 26, with 10 officers and 16 crew. Sir William Alexander has nine additional berths.

== Operational history ==
The ship was constructed by Marine Industries at their yard in Tracy, Quebec with the yard number 451. Sir William Alexander was launched on 23 October 1986 and entered service on 13 February 1987. The ship is registered in Ottawa, Ontario, and homeported at Dartmouth, Nova Scotia.

=== Hurricane Katrina relief mission ===
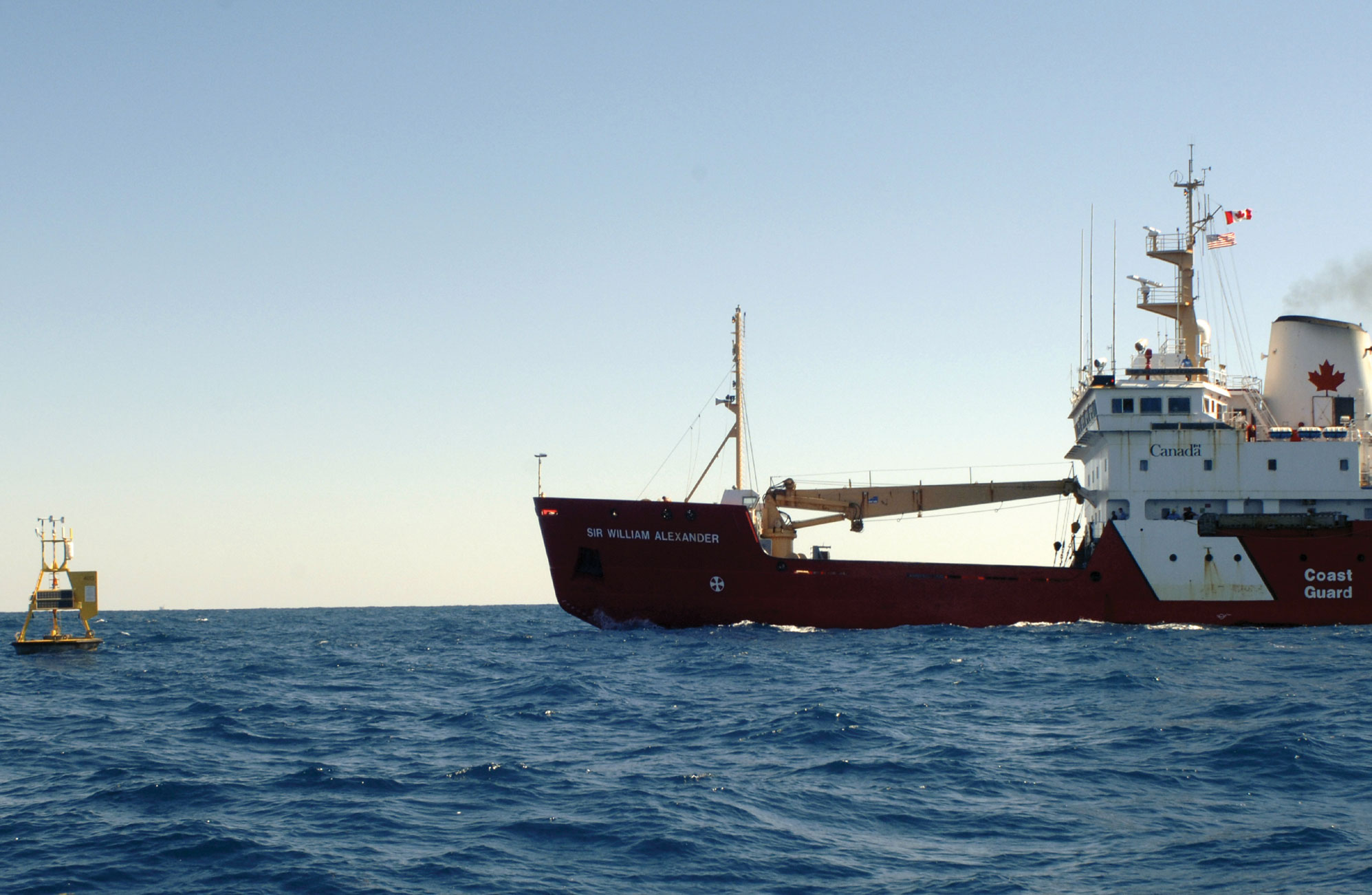
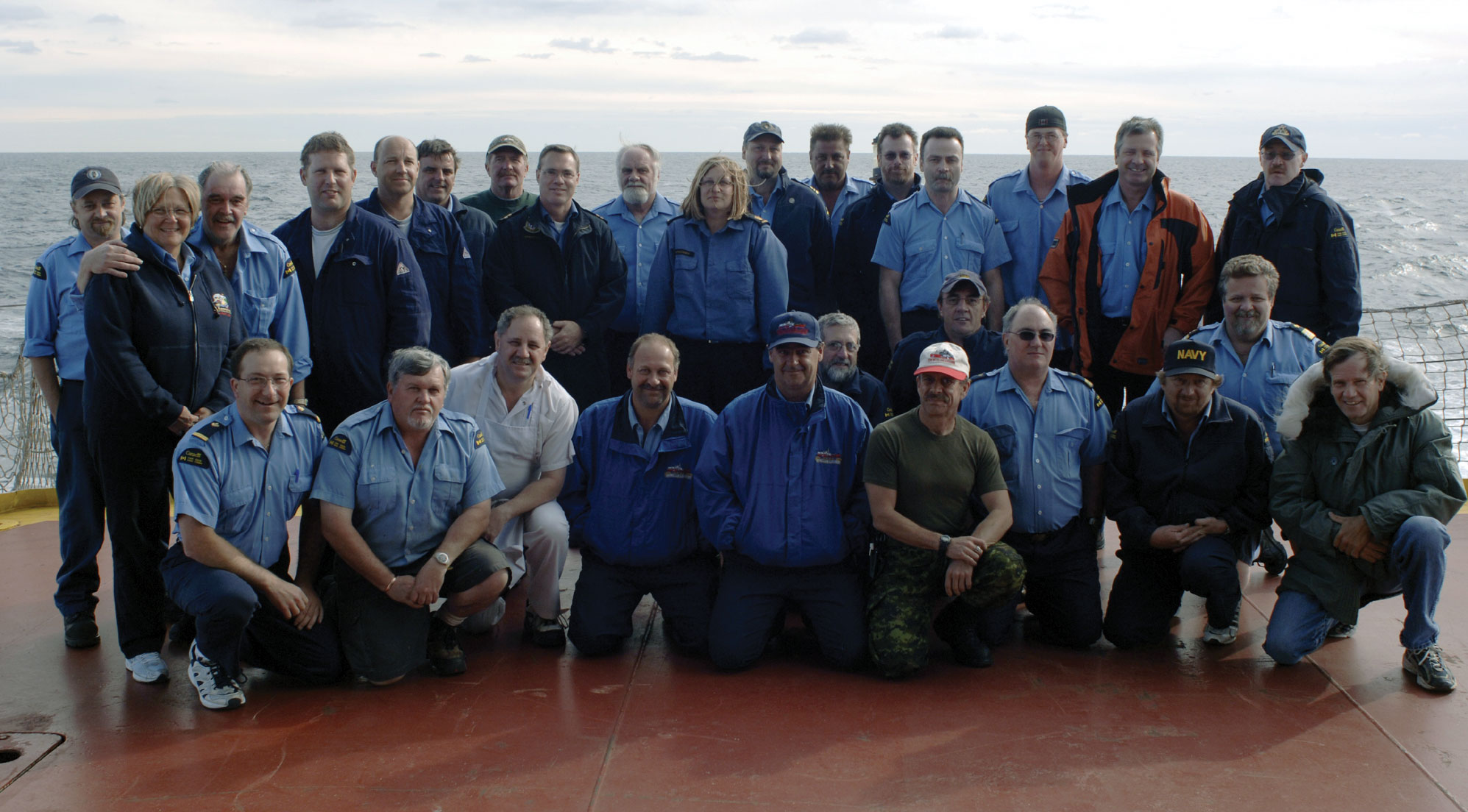
CCGS Sir William Alexander assisting in New Orleans relief operations following Hurricane Katrina; mission crew shortly before arriving home.

On 6 September 2005, CCGS Sir William Alexander left Halifax Harbour, together with the Canadian warships Athabaskan, Ville de Québec and Toronto, to participate in a humanitarian aid mission named Operation Unison, which provided relief to part of the devastated Gulf of Mexico coast of the United States following Hurricane Katrina.

Sir William Alexander participated in the mission as a supply vessel, and also to effect repairs to aids to navigation (navaids). The decision to assign Sir William Alexander to the Operation Unison task force was unprecedented in Canadian Coast Guard history as no icebreaker from the service has operated for an extended period of time in southern tropical waters such as the Gulf of Mexico, aside from transiting the Panama Canal to and from British Columbia.

On 19 September 2005, it was announced that the three warships were no longer needed in the Gulf of Mexico, given the massive U.S. military response as well as increasing civilian aid flowing into the region. Sir William Alexander was exempted from returning to Canada however, as her heavy lift capabilities were considered useful for ongoing repairs to aids to navigation which were destroyed by Hurricane Katrina, and later Hurricane Rita (23 September). On 28 September, the Minister of Fisheries and Oceans announced that Sir William Alexander was being retasked from relief efforts and navigation systems repair to assist the National Oceanic and Atmospheric Administration in repairing the damaged network of weather buoys along the Gulf of Mexico, Caribbean Sea, and Atlantic coasts. She returned to CCG Base Dartmouth from Operation Unison on 24 October 2005.

=== Post-Katrina operations ===
Sir William Alexander was involved in a fatal towing incident involving the fishing vessel L'Acadien II during the 2008 Canadian commercial seal hunt. On 30 September 2014, a Canadian Armed Forces Bell CH-146 Griffon helicopter clipped Sir William Alexander's antenna during a training exercise in Mahone Bay. The helicopter was forced to make an emergency landing in Lunenburg, Nova Scotia. In February 2017, Sir William Alexander was dispatched to aid the merchant vessel Thorco Crown, which had caught fire in the Cabot Strait. The engine room fire was extinguished but the merchant was disabled. When a tugboat arrived to take Thorco Crown in tow, the tugboat was unable to secure the towline. Sir William Alexander then took Thorco Crown in tow during the night, transferring the tow to the tugboat in the morning.
