= AVIC AC332 =

Chinese helicopter

AC332
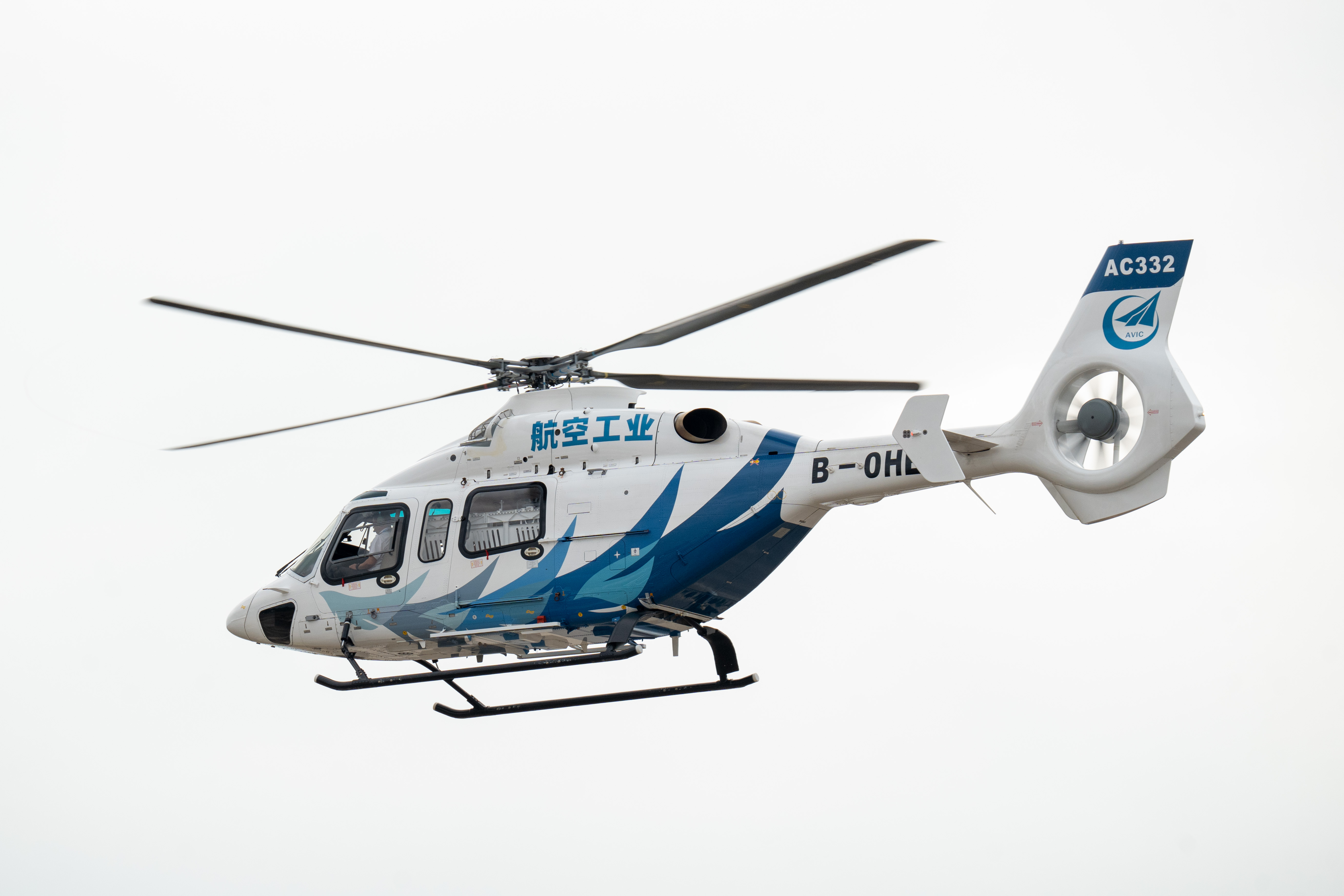
- AVIC AC332 helicopter in Zhuhai airshow 2024

General information
- Type: Helicopter
- National origin: China
- Manufacturer: Aviation Industry Corporation of China
- Designer: Li Shengwei
- Status: Under development (2023)

History
- First flight: 7 April 2023

The AVIC AC332 is a Chinese civil helicopter that is under development by the Aviation Industry Corporation of China (AVIC). The AC 332's chief designer at AVIC is Li Shengwei. The aircraft is intended to be type certified for production.

The design prototype had its first flight on 7 April 2023.

The AC332 designation was previously applied to an unrelated project for a scaled down version of the Russian Mil Mi-26 that was to have first flown in 2032.

== Design and development ==
The aircraft is intended as a utility helicopter for personnel transport, search and rescue and law enforcement, including high density altitude operations. The design features a single, four-bladed main rotor, a fenestron tail rotor, twin engines, an enclosed cabin and skid-type landing gear.

The design has seating for two crew members and ten passengers. It is expected to have a lower price than comparable western helicopters.

The aircraft has a gross weight of 3,850 kg (8,488 lb), a maximum cruising speed of 260 km/h (140 kn), a service ceiling of 6,000 m (19,685 ft) and a range of 693 km (374 nmi). Maximum take-off altitude is 4,500 m (14,764 ft).

The prototype was first flown on 7 April 2021 and type certification is forecast to be completed in 2025.

Aviation writer Mark Huber described the design as "stylistically a cross between the Bell 429 and the Airbus H145".

== Operators ==
In April 2023, the company reported that it had orders for 24 aircraft, including six for an aircraft leasing company based in Xiamen and 18 for a consortium of Chinese general aviation operators.

== Specifications (AC332) ==
Data from AVweb, AIN, Flight Global

General characteristics

- Crew: two
- Capacity: ten passengers
- Gross weight: 3,850 kg (8,487 lb)
- Powerplant: 2 × turboshaft engines

Performance

- Cruise speed: 260 km/h (160 mph, 140 kn)
- Service ceiling: 6,000 m (19,685 ft)

== See also ==
Aircraft of comparable role, configuration, and era

- Airbus H145
- Bell 429

Related lists

- List of rotorcraft
