= CCGS Kopit Hopson 1752 =

Canadian Coast Guard icebreaker

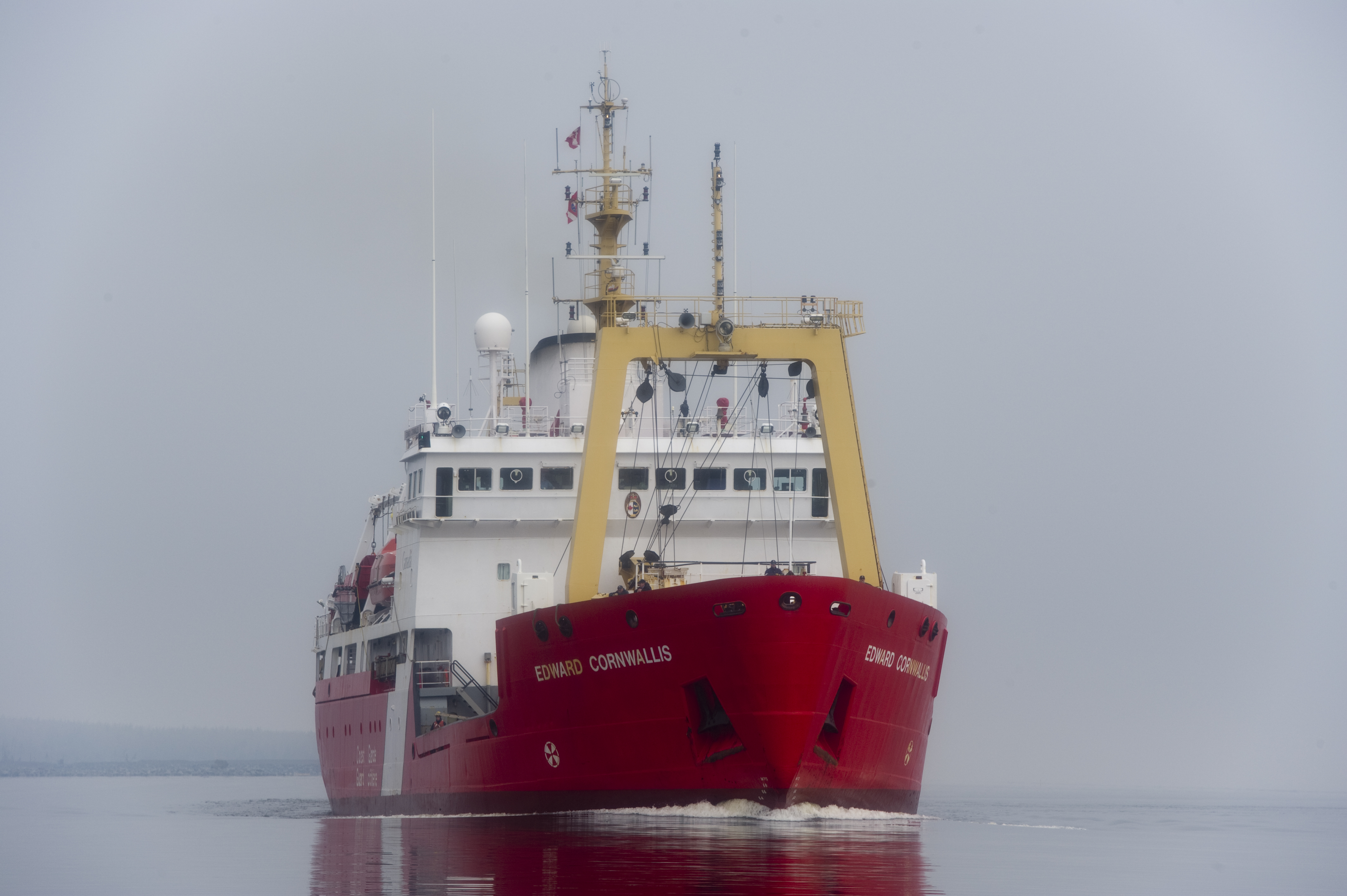
- Edward Cornwallis in May 2012

History

Canada
- Name: Edward Cornwallis (1986–2021); Kopit Hopson 1752 (2021–present)
- Namesake: Edward Cornwallis (1986–2021); Jean-Baptiste Cope, Peregrine Hopson, and the Treaty of 1752 (2021–present)
- Operator: Canadian Coast Guard
- Port of registry: Ottawa
- Builder: MIL-Davie Shipbuilding, Sorel
- Yard number: 450
- Launched: 24 February 1986
- Commissioned: 14 August 1986
- In service: 1986–present
- Home port: CCG Base Dartmouth (Maritime Region)
- Identification: CGJV; IMO number: 8320470
- Status: in active service

General characteristics
- Class & type: Martha L. Black-class light icebreaker and buoy tender
- Tonnage: 3,727.2 GT; 1,503.0 NT
- Displacement: 4,662 long tons (4,737 t) full load
- Length: 83 m (272 ft 4 in)
- Beam: 16.2 m (53 ft 2 in)
- Draught: 5.75 m (18 ft 10 in)
- Ice class: CASPPR Arctic Class 2
- Propulsion: Diesel-electric AC – 3 Alco 251F-16V
- Speed: 16 knots (30 km/h)
- Range: 6,500 nmi (12,000 km) at 13.7 knots (25.4 km/h)
- Endurance: 120 days
- Complement: 25
- Sensors & processing systems: 1 × Racal Decca Bridgemaster navigational radar (I band)
- Aircraft carried: Originally 1 × MBB Bo 105 or Bell 206L helicopter, currently 1 × Bell 429 GlobalRanger or Bell 412EPI
- Aviation facilities: Flight deck and hangar

CCGS Kopit Hopson 1752, formerly CCGS Edward Cornwallis, (Note: CCGS stands for Canadian Coast Guard Ship) is a Martha L. Black-class icebreaker of the Canadian Coast Guard. She serves as a light icebreaker and buoy tender on the East Coast of Canada. Entering service in 1986, the vessel is homeported at Dartmouth, Nova Scotia. The vessel was originally named after Lieutenant General Edward Cornwallis, a British Army officer and founding governor of Halifax, Nova Scotia. Due to the controversial history of the vessel's initial namesake, the ship was renamed in consultation with indigenous peoples, to commemorate Jean-Baptiste Cope under his Mi'kmaq name, British Governor Peregrine Hopson, and the year of the peace and friendship treaty created by former Governor Edward Cornwallis.

== Design and description ==
Kopit Hopson 1752 and sister ship CCGS Sir William Alexander differ from the rest of the class by having one less deck in the superstructure and their buoy-handling derricks mounted forward. Kopit Hopson 1752 displaces 4,662 long tons (4,737 t) fully loaded with a 3,727.2 gross tonnage (GT) and a 1,503.0 net tonnage (NT). The ship is 83.0 metres (272 ft 4 in) long overall with a beam of 16.2 metres (53 ft 2 in) and a draught of 5.8 metres (19 ft 0 in).

The vessel is powered and propelled by two fixed-pitch propellers and bow thrusters powered by three Alco 251F diesel-electric engines creating 8,847 horsepower (6,597 kW) and three Canadian GE generators producing 6 megawatts of AC power driving two Canadian GE motors creating 7,040 horsepower (5,250 kW). The ship is also equipped with one Caterpillar 3306 emergency generator, and one Caterpillar 3508 auxiliary generator. This gives the ship a maximum speed of 16 knots (30 km/h). Capable of carrying 783.7 long tons (796.3 t) of diesel fuel, Kopit Hopson 1752 has a maximum range of 6,500 nautical miles (12,000 km) at a cruising speed of 13.7 knots (25.4 km/h) and can stay at sea for up to 120 days. The ship is certified as Arctic Class 2.

The icebreaker is equipped with one Racal Decca Bridgemaster navigational radar operating on the I band. The vessel is equipped with a 980 m^{3} (35,000 cu ft) cargo hold. Kopit Hopson 1752 has a flight deck and hangar which originally housed light helicopters of the MBB Bo 105 or Bell 206L types, but in the 2010s, the Bell 429 GlobalRanger and Bell 412EPI were acquired by the Canadian Coast Guard to replace the older helicopters. The ship has a complement of 25, with 10 officers and 15 crew. Kopit Hopson 1752 has 9 additional berths.

== Operational history ==
The ship was constructed by Marine Industries at their yard in Tracy, Quebec, with the yard number 450. Edward Cornwallis was launched on 24 February 1986 and entered service on 14 August 1986. The ship is registered in Ottawa, Ontario, and homeported at Dartmouth, Nova Scotia.

On 17 December 2007, Edward Cornwallis was dispatched to recover the 140-metre (459 ft 4 in) barge Houston carrying diesel fuel that had cast adrift in St. George's Bay near Port Hood, Nova Scotia. Facing 70 km/h (43 mph) winds and 5-metre (16 ft) waves, members of the crew boarded the barge. They rescued the crew and kept the barge from going aground until a tugboat arrived on 19 December. Five members of the crew were later awarded medals for their efforts.

On 2 March 2020, Shelburne Ship Repair was awarded a CA$12.1 million contract to refit Edward Cornwallis at their yard in Shelburne, Nova Scotia. Work was expected to begin in April and last until January 2021. During the refit, the ship was renamed to CCGS Kopit Hopson 1752.

In June 2023, the ship was one of those engaged in the search efforts involved in the Titan submersible implosion.

== Names ==
=== Launch name ===
The ship was originally launched as CCGS Edward Cornwallis in 1986, named after Edward Cornwallis, a British military officer, who became governor of Nova Scotia. He was notorious for having a 1749 scalping proclamation for a bounty on the heads of Mi'kmaq; and funding Gorham's Rangers, a mercenary unit that harassed the Mi'kmaq. As Cornwallis' legacy has been reevaluated, the name of the ship became problematic to the greater public, and the Mi'kmaq requested a name change.

=== Renaming ===
Due to the controversial history of the ship's original namesake, the ship was pending a rename by the Mi'kmaq. The Halifax Shipping News reported on 31 March 2021 that the Canadian Coast Guard vessel formerly known as Edward Cornwallis, had been re-registered as CCGS Kopit Hopson 1752. The new name was chosen in consultation with indigenous peoples and recognizes Jean-Baptiste Cope under his Mi'kmaq name, British Governor Peregrine Hopson, and the year of the peace and friendship treaty created by former Governor Edward Cornwallis.
