= CCGS Sir Wilfrid Laurier =

Icebreaker in the Canadian Coast Guard

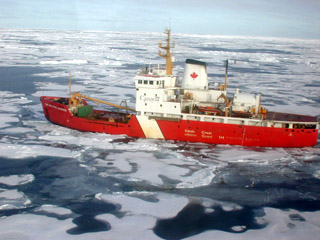
- CCGS Sir Wilfrid Laurier

History

Canada
- Name: Sir Wilfrid Laurier
- Namesake: Sir Wilfrid Laurier
- Operator: Canadian Coast Guard
- Port of registry: Ottawa, Ontario
- Builder: Canadian Shipbuilding, Collingwood, Ontario
- Yard number: 230
- Launched: 6 December 1985
- Commissioned: 15 November 1986
- In service: 1986–present
- Refit: 2024
- Home port: CCG Base Victoria (Pacific Region)
- Identification: CGJK; IMO number: 8320456
- Status: in active service

General characteristics (as built)
- Class & type: Martha L. Black-class light icebreaker
- Tonnage: 3,812.1 GT; 1,533.6 NT
- Displacement: 4,662 long tons (4,737 t) (full load)
- Length: 83 m (272 ft 4 in)
- Beam: 16.2 m (53 ft 2 in)
- Draught: 5.8 m (19 ft 0 in)
- Ice class: CASPPR Arctic Class 2
- Installed power: 3 × Alco 251F Diesel Electric, producing 8,448 hp (6,300 kW)
- Propulsion: 2 × GE electric motors (total 7,040 hp [5,250 kW]) turning 2 fixed-pitch propellers
- Speed: 15.5 knots (28.7 km/h; 17.8 mph)
- Range: 6,500 nmi (12,000 km; 7,500 mi) at 11 knots (20 km/h; 13 mph)
- Endurance: 120 days
- Complement: 27
- Aircraft carried: Originally 1 × MBB Bo 105 or Bell 206L helicopter, currently 1 × Bell 429 GlobalRanger or Bell 412EPI
- Aviation facilities: Hangar and flight deck

General characteristics (2024 refit)
- Installed power: 3 × Wärtsilä 26 series engines
- Notes: Otherwise same as built

CCGS Sir Wilfrid Laurier (Note: CCGS stands for Canadian Coast Guard Ship) is a Martha L. Black-class light icebreaker and major navaids tender of the Canadian Coast Guard. Built in 1986 by Canadian Shipbuilding at Collingwood, Ontario, Canada, she was the last ship constructed there. The ship has been based out of Victoria, British Columbia.

== Description and design ==
Designed as a light icebreaker and buoy tender, Sir Wilfrid Laurier displaces 4,662 long tons (4,737 t) fully loaded with a 3,812.1 gross tonnage (GT) and a 1,533.6 net tonnage (NT). The ship is 83.0 metres (272 ft 4 in) long overall with a beam of 16.2 metres (53 ft 2 in) and a draught of 5.8 metres (19 ft 0 in).

The vessel is propelled by two fixed-pitch propellers and bow thrusters powered by three Alco 251F diesel-electric engines creating 8,847 horsepower (6,597 kW) and three Canadian GE generators producing 6 megawatts of AC power driving two Canadian GE motors creating 7,040 horsepower (5,250 kW). The ship is also equipped with one Caterpillar 3306 emergency generator. This gives the ship a maximum speed of 15.5 knots (28.7 km/h). Capable of carrying 1,096.0 long tons (1,113.6 t) of diesel fuel, Sir Wilfrid Laurier has a maximum range of 6,500 nautical miles (12,000 km) at a cruising speed of 11 knots (20 km/h) and can stay at sea for up to 120 days. The ship is certified as Arctic Class 2.

The icebreaker is equipped with one Racal Decca Bridgemaster navigational radar operating on the I band. The vessel has a 980 m^{3} (35,000 cu ft) cargo hold. Sir Wilfrid Laurier has a flight deck and hangar which originally accommodated light helicopters of the MBB Bo 105 or Bell 206L types, but in the 2010s, the Bell 429 GlobalRanger and Bell 412EPI were acquired by the Canadian Coast Guard to replace the older helicopters. The ship has a complement of 27, with 10 officers and 17 crew. Sir Wilfrid Laurier has 26 additional berths.

=== Workboat/lifeboat ===
Sir Wilfrid Laurier's workboat/lifeboat No. 1 was re-purposed as a training boat/work boat that has been operated by the Maritime Affairs Committee Navy League of Canada – Outaouais Branch since 1995. The boat was named Fred Gordon, in honour of WO1 (ret'd) Fred Gordon, EM, CD former Regimental Sergeant-Major for Le Régiment de Hull (RCAC) 1967–1971. Fred Gordon was a member of the Hull Legion who supported the Royal Canadian Navy Sea Cadet Corps la Hulloise (CCMRC No. 230) sponsored by the Outaouais Branch of the Navy League of Canada.

== Operational history ==
The ship was constructed by Canadian Shipbuilding at their yard in Collingwood, Ontario with the yard number 230. Named for a former prime minister of Canada, Sir Wilfrid Laurier was launched on 6 December 1985 and entered service on 15 November 1986. The ship is registered in Ottawa, Ontario, and homeported at Victoria, British Columbia. The ship was initially assigned to the Laurentian Region, but transferred to the Western Region.

Sir Wilfrid Laurier is a multi-tasked vessel which carries out a wide variety of Coast Guard programs including buoy tending, search and rescue, science work, lightstation re-supply, beacon maintenance, radio repeater site maintenance, and icebreaking/escorting, aids to navigation and science work during summer patrols in the Arctic.

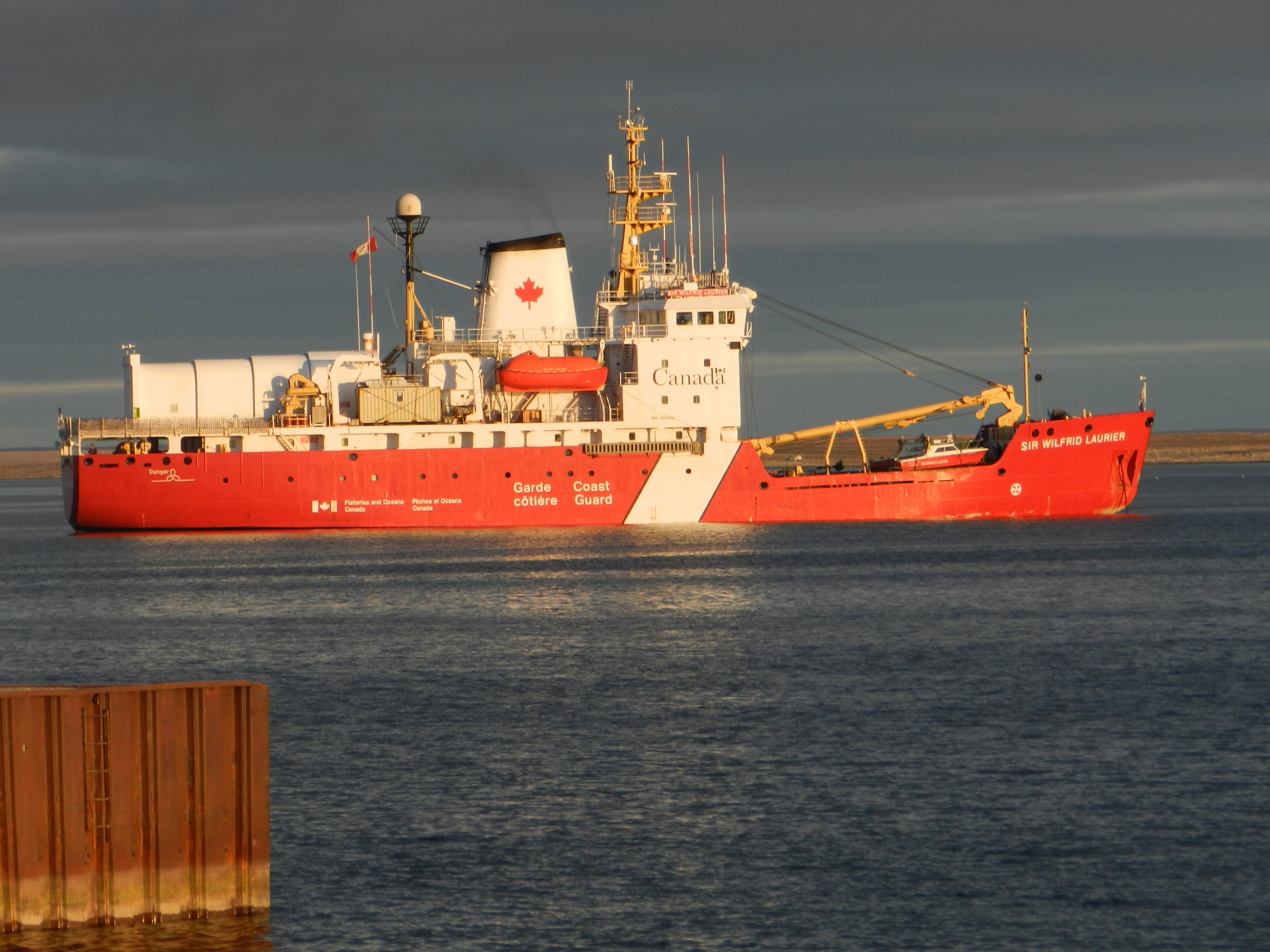
Sir Wilfrid Laurier in Cambridge Bay prior to departing to search for Franklin's lost expedition

The vessel has been employed on research voyages and the rescue of survivors of the car ferry Queen of the North. In 2014 the ship was part of the search for John Franklin's ships, Erebus and Terror, during the Victoria Strait Expedition. Erebus was found on that expedition. In 2016, Sir Wilfrid Laurier, accompanied by the Royal Canadian Navy vessel Shawinigan, carried archaeologists to the site for further research. The two vessels also continued the search for Terror.

Sir Wilfrid Laurier arrived at Seaspan’s Vancouver Drydock in North Vancouver in November 2023 to undergo an extensive refit through April 2024, as part of a Vessel Life Extension. In September 2024, Sir Wilfrid Laurier departed Canada and arrived at Yokohama, being the first CCG ship to make a port call and speak to personnel from the Japan Coast Guard and Ministry of Agriculture, Forestry and Fisheries while having the ship open to the public. During the voyage, Sir Wilfrid Laurier's officers conducted several anti-IUU fishing operations. The ship returned to Victoria on 28 October.
