= L'Acadien II =

Canadian-registered fishing vessel

L'Acadien II was a Canadian-registered fishing vessel that capsized and sank on March 29, 2008. The vessel was being towed by Canadian Coast Guard Ship (CCGS) Sir William Alexander off Cape Breton, Nova Scotia at the time of the incident. Two of the crew of six were rescued and four men died in the incident. Recovery efforts have not located the sunken trawler nor the missing crew member who is now presumed dead. Canadian authorities have launched independent investigations into the incident.

== Career ==
L'Acadien II was a 12-metre fishing trawler.

== Mechanical trouble ==
L'Acadien II and her crew of six set out from Magdalen Islands the morning of March 28, 2008 to take part in the 2008 Canadian commercial seal hunt. She lost her rudder later in the day in the ice floes northeast of Neil's Harbour, Nova Scotia on Cape Breton Island.

She radioed for help from the Coast Guard and Sir William Alexander came to assist the tow.

== Capsize and sinking ==
Witnesses say the Sir William Alexander was going too fast and failed to realize L'Acadien II had swerved into a large cake of ice and capsized at approximately 46°49′17″N 60°3′59″W.

The Transportation Safety Board (TSB) investigation report released later that year found that the clutch was likely engaged in the ahead position with the engine running as it left the centreline track. Combined with the deflected rudder, this would have caused L'Acadien II to sheer to port, whereupon it struck the ice.

Once the vessel struck the ice, the combined effects of the towline force and direction, the fishing vessel's ahead propulsion, and the inertia of the CCGS Sir William Alexander propelled L'Acadien II partially onto the ice and then back into the water on its starboard side, whereupon it subsequently capsized.

Navy divers searched the waters for four men, who had been sleeping in the lower decks of the vessel. When the vessel had capsized, a Cormorant helicopter and a Hercules aircraft came to aid the rescue. The vessel had since been secured to the side of the Coast Guard's vessel.

== Rescue and recovery ==
Two men, who were at the upper decks during the incident, were rescued by nearby fishing vessel Madelinot War Lord and transferred to Sir William Alexander. A Coast Guard helicopter subsequently transported them to Magdalen Islands. The bodies of three crew members that died in the incident were recovered by navy divers and brought aboard Sir William Alexander. They have been identified as Bruno Bourque, the boat's owner and captain; Gilles Leblanc (in his 50s); and Marc-Andre Deraspe (in his early 20s). Crewmember Carl Aucoin remains missing and is presumed dead.

The search was scaled back by late afternoon on March 29 and the local Royal Canadian Mounted Police (RCMP) has since been handling the case.

Fisheries and Oceans Canada (DFO) has recommenced to find missing crewmember Carl Aucoin and recover L'Acadien II on April 3 and since then has provided daily updates in its media releases on its website. CCGS George R. Pearkes, CCGS Edward Cornwallis and CCGS Terry Fox were engaged in the search based on the last known coordinates of the vessel, drift patterns and ice conditions. Canadian Forces Aurora and other patrols provided aerial support and surveillance. Canadian Forces divers were on stand-by once the vessel is located. The operation would be accompanied by officials of Transportation Safety Board.

Poor visibility due to fog and low ceiling hampered the recovery operation, and on April 10, DFO has announced that CCG would call off the recovery effort. According to DFO, the search has covered an area of approximately 9,800 square nautical miles.

== Aftermath ==
=== Sea Shepherd Conservation Society ===
A release from the Sea Shepherd Conservation Society on April 2, said that it "recognizes that the deaths of four sealers is a tragedy but Sea Shepherd also recognizes that the slaughter of hundreds of thousands of seal pups is an even greater tragedy." Paul Watson was quoted in the same release: "One of the sealers was quoted as saying that he felt absolutely helpless as he watched the boat sink with sealers onboard. I can’t think of anything that defines helplessness and fear more than a seal pup on the ice that can’t swim or escape as it is approached by some cigarette smoking ape with a club. This is a seal nursery and these men are sadistic baby killers and that might offend some people but it is the unvarnished truth – they are vicious killers who are now pleading for sympathy because some of their own died while engaged in a viciously brutal activity."

Because of these quotes, the leader of the Green Party of Canada Elizabeth May decided on April 3 to resign from the advisory board of the Sea Shepherd Conservation Society.

=== Investigation ===
The RCMP was engaged in reviewing the incident and the Transportation Safety Board (TSB) also conducted its own investigation. Coast Guard undertook an incident review, including its current towing policy. A final report was presented to the DFO minister and the Commissioner of the Coast Guard on 26 November 2008.

The TSB report detailed the cause of the capsize and that the L'Acadien II was not designed, constructed, or adequately modified to navigate in ice.

The TSB report found the following risks that may cause similar incident to occur:

- The Canadian Coast Guard has no comprehensive safety policies, procedures, guidelines, or practices that address the risks associated with towing small vessels in ice.
- Numerous small fishing vessels continue to operate during the seal hunt in ice conditions for which they were neither designed nor constructed.

The TSB also reported the following findings:

- The emergency position-indicating radio beacon (EPIRB) signal from L'Acadien II was never received.
- The language used posed no barrier to communication between the vessels.

== See also ==
- List of missing ships
