= 2008 Canadian commercial seal hunt =

- Date: March 28, 2008 - April 2008 (November 2007 - May 2008)
- Location: The Gulf of St. Lawrence and around Newfoundland, Quebec and Nova Scotia, Canada

Canada's 2008 annual commercial seal hunt in the Gulf of St. Lawrence and around Newfoundland, Quebec and Nova Scotia began on March 28. The hunting season lasts from mid-November to mid-May, but the hunt mainly occurs in March and April. Canada's seal hunt is the world's largest hunt for marine mammals.

Some animal rights groups were given observer permits and monitored the hunt. They said it was cruel and that it ravaged the seal population. Sealers said it was sustainable, humane, and well-managed.

The pelts and oil were sold to buyers in Norway, Russia, and China.

The total allowable catch for 2008 was set by the Canadian government at 275,000 harp seals (the quota includes 2,000 seals for personal seal hunting, and 4,950 seals for the Aboriginal seal hunt), 8,200 hooded seals, and 12,000 grey seals.

== 2008 regulations ==
A new rule in the Marine Mammal Regulations for 2008 required hunters to slit the seal's main arteries under its flippers, after clubbing or shooting a seal. The European Union recommended adding this rule in a report released in December 2007. This was to prevent the seal from having to withstand the pain of being skinned alive.

== Locations and quota ==
The hunt in the southern Gulf of St. Lawrence started on Friday March 28, 2008. A handful of sealing vessels set out before dawn from the Magdalen Islands. In the first hour of the hunt, only 15 seals were killed. The ice had made it hard for the 16 vessels, carrying roughly 100 hunters, to get near the seals. Most of the hunters in these first days of the hunt were from the Magdalen Islands. The average seal hunt brings in about $1 million annually to the Magdalen Islands. As of March 30, about 1000 had been killed. On March 30, the hunt in the Gulf of St. Lawrence opened for the people from New Brunswick, Prince Edward Island and Nova Scotia. As of April 18, sealers in the Gulf of St. Lawrence had taken about half of their total allowable catch (TAC) of 51,500 seals.

The biggest part of the 2008 Canadian seal hunt took place off of Newfoundland and Labrador, known as the Front. The hunt in the Gulf of St. Lawrence and the Front officially began on April 11 and 12 respectively. Official opening times and license conditions were released on April 7. According to Fisheries Department spokesman Larry Yetman, up to 120 larger boats were heading to the Front on April 12.

As of April 18, sealers on the Front had taken 56% of a total 194,000 seals allowed to be taken in the area. By April 18, longliners on the Front had taken c. 79% of their TAC of 112,000 seals. Small boats on the Front had taken 27% of their TAC of 71,000 seals.

The seal hunt for longliners on the Front closed on April 19, 2008. At the time, these were the only groups of hunters close to catching their quota.

== Vessels ==
=== Four men missing ===
On March 29, 2008, a 12-metre fishing vessel with six men, L'Acadien II, capsized near Cape Breton. Navy divers searched the waters for four men, who had been sleeping in the lower decks of the vessel. Two men, who were at the upper decks, were rescued on to another fishing boat. The vessel had capsized when it was being towed by the Canadian Coast Guard's Sir William Alexander. The L'Acadien II took part in the seal hunt, and had to be towed because of a steering problem. When the vessel had capsized, a Cormorant helicopter and a Hercules aircraft came to aid the rescue. The vessel had since been secured to the side of the Coast Guard's vessel. The navy divers recovered the bodies of three of the missing men on March 29, with one man still missing. The men who died were from the Magdalen Islands. They have been identified as Bruno Bourque, the boat's owner and captain, Gilles Leblanc (in his 50s), and Marc-Andre Deraspe (in his early 20s). Still missing but presumed dead was Carl Aucoin.

=== Technical problems ===
On the evening of March 28, it was reported that two sealing vessels were taking in water, and one vessel had mechanical problems, in heavy ice conditions off Cape Breton. Two icebreakers were sent out to help the vessels out of the ice. On March 29, the coast guard and Department of Defence rescued seven people before their vessel, the Annie Marie, was crushed in the ice pack northeast off Cape Breton.

On April 14, the vessel Lucy May burnt to the waterline on Newfoundlands's northeast coast, after the crew had been rescued by a Cormorant helicopter. Also on April 14, the vessel BS Venture had mechanical trouble on Newfoundland's west coast, and six men escaped from the vessel before it ran ashore. The men reached land safely in Rocky Harbour in a self-brought speedboat.

The vessel White Bay Challenger started to take in water on April 17 because it had been struck by ice while it was being escorted by the Canadian Coast Guard Ship Ann Harvey. The White Bay Challenger sank after the seven people on board had been taken aboard the Ann Harvey.

== Observer permits ==
Journalists have a constitutional right to observe the hunt that was affirmed under a 1989 Federal Court of Appeal ruling. The federal government have a right to issue observer permits, to prevent the ice from being overcrowded with observers. A Seal Fishery Observation Licence in 2008 cost $25, and regulations on who is eligible for a license were found in the Marine Mammal Regulations.

After noon on March 28, federal fisheries officials issued observer permits for the hunt's opening day to activists and journalists. A couple of hours before the permits were issued, Phil Jenkins of the Department of Fisheries and Oceans said: "We're going to delay the giving out of permits until we can understand what exact level of sealing is going on." When the permits were issued, the International Fund for Animal Welfare (IFAW) managed to fly out to film some scenes. The journalists (such as the United Kingdom's Sky TV) and the representatives of the Humane Society of the United States (HSUS) were unable to make it to the ice floes because the weather had turned bad during the day, making it very hard to fly a helicopter. DFO spokesman Phil Jenkins said that 60 observer permits had been issued.

The permits for March 29 were issued on the evening of March 28.

== Seals ==
According to the Marine Mammal Regulations, Canada does not allow the hunting of whitecoats. Whitecoats are suckling pups of the harp or grey seal under two weeks of age.

Most of the seals that were hunted are young harp seals, called beaters. They were whelped (born) in February or early March in whelping patches on the ice. Such patches vary from 20 to 200 square kilometres, and may contain as many as 2,000 adult females per square kilometre. The pups are abandoned by their mothers at two weeks of age, and remain in the whelping patches until the ice starts to melt in March or early April. The hunt takes place in and around these whelping patches.

== Seal product sales ==
Carino, a Norwegian-owned company, is a major buyer of Canadian seals. The Carino plant is located in South Dildo in Newfoundland and Labrador. Carino's Norwegian parent company, Rieber Skinn, announced in April 2008 that its factory in Bergen, Norway, with 17 employees, was closing down within a year. As a result, sealskin from seals captured in Norway was to be processed in their plant in Canada. An agreement with Canada says that Rieber is bound to process sealskin in Canada.

== The R/V Farley Mowat protest ==
On March 24, the Sea Shepherd Conservation Society's vessel, the R/V Farley Mowat, left Bermuda to head for the Gulf of St. Lawrence. The seventeen persons on the vessel were from the Netherlands, the United Kingdom, France, Sweden, South Africa, Canada and the United States.

On March 21, Lawrence Cannon of the Canadian government had sent a fax to the Farley Mowat, ordering it not to enter Canadian waters and warning it of prosecution if the order was not complied with. Paul Watson replied to the minister that the conventions of the International Maritime Organization apply to commercial ships, but the Farley Mowat is a Dutch-registered yacht. He said the Farley Mowat would enter the Canadian Economic Exclusion Zone, but not the 12-nautical-mile (22 km) territorial limit.

=== Collision ===
On March 30, according to the Sea Shepherd Conservation Society, the Farley Mowat was rammed twice by the icebreaker Des Groseilliers of the Canadian Coast Guard. The collision occurred after the Farley Mowat failed to comply with a request from Des Groseilliers not to approach the seal hunt area. Plates on the Farley Mowat were buckled by the contact, but there was no other damage. Phil Jenkins of the Department of Fisheries and Oceans called the allegation "absolutely false." Loyola Hearn, the Minister of Fisheries and Oceans, issued a statement on March 31, saying the allegations were "completely untrue", and that the Farley Mowat manoeuvred itself in front of the Des Groseilliers to cause a collision as an attempt to provoke a confrontation and attract media attention. Paul Watson replied on the Sea Shepherd Conservation Society's website, on April 1, that Des Groseilliers was faster and more manoeuvrable in the ice than the Farley Mowat, and that the Farley Mowat was stopped when it was hit for the second time. He said the entire incident was captured on video by a man on board the Farley Mowat, and the Humane Society of the United States (HSUS) helicopter was going to pick up the video on March 31, but had been grounded by the government.

Sealer Shane Briand said the Farley Mowat came close to the hunters about sixty km off Cape Breton and broke up the ice under a hunter on March 30. He said his ship and crew was harassed until the Des Groseilliers arrived.

=== Paul Watson's remarks ===
A release from the Sea Shepherd Conservation Society on April 2 said: "The Sea Shepherd Conservation Society recognizes that the deaths of four sealers is a tragedy but Sea Shepherd also recognizes that the slaughter of hundreds of thousands of seal pups is an even greater tragedy." Paul Watson was quoted in the same release as saying: "One of the sealers was quoted as saying that he felt absolutely helpless as he watched the boat sink with sealers on board. I can't think of anything that defines helplessness and fear more than a seal pup on the ice that can't swim or escape as it is approached by some cigarette smoking ape with a club. This is a seal nursery and these men are sadistic baby killers and that might offend some people but it is the unvarnished truth — they are vicious killers who are now pleading for sympathy because some of their own died while engaged in a viciously brutal activity."

Because of these statements, the leader of the Green Party of Canada, Elizabeth May, decided on April 3 to resign from the advisory board of the Sea Shepherd Conservation Society.

On April 4, angry fishermen used axes to cut the mooring lines of the Farley Mowat in Saint-Pierre, where it was tied up. According to a fisherman, the ropes were cut because the fishermen of Saint-Pierre did not accept what Paul Watson had said. There had first been a confrontation between the activists and the fishermen.

=== Charges ===
On April 5, the Minister of Fisheries and Oceans Loyola Hearn announced that charges were being laid against the Farley Mowat's Dutch captain, Alexander Cornelissen, and Swedish First Officer Peter Hammarstedt. They were charged with contraventions of the Marine Mammal Regulations (MMR) on getting too close to the hunt without an observer permit. Captain Alexander Cornelissen was also charged under the Fisheries Act for obstructing or hindering a Fishery Officer, a fishery guardian, or an inspector.

On April 12, armed Royal Canadian Mounted Police officers boarded and seized the Farley Mowat. They had first asked permission to board the vessel, but were refused. The Farley Mowat's captain and first officer were arrested. According to the Fisheries Department, the Farley Mowat was to be kept in DFO custody until a court ordered the release of the vessel. According to Paul Watson of the Sea Shepherd Conservation Society, the boarding happened in international waters, and the Farley Mowat had never strayed into Canada's 12-nautical-mile (22 km) territorial limit. He said this was proven in the ship's logs and GPS records, which the Canadian authorities had seized. According to the Department of Fisheries and Oceans, the vessel was seized in Canadian national waters.

The captain and first officer were each granted a $5,000 bail in a Sydney, Nova Scotia courtroom on April 13. The 17 crew members went on a hunger strike until the two men were to be released. The Sea Shepherd Conservation Society bailed the men out with $10,000 donated by author Farley Mowat.

The next court appearance was scheduled for May 1, 2008. A new hearing was then scheduled for May 9 and a preliminary hearing for July 2.

== Possible European Union ban ==
The European Union considered a ban on all seal products in the wake of the 2008 hunt. A Canadian delegation headed to Europe in March 2008 to lobby for the hunt. The delegation includes Canadian Fisheries Conservation representative Loyola Sullivan, Nunavut Premier Paul Okalik, Newfoundland Natural Resources Minister Kathy Dunderdale, Fur Institute of Canada executive director Rob Cahill, and sealers Mark Small and Denis Longuepee. The delegation travelled to London, Brussels, Berlin, Vienna, and Paris.

== See also ==
- Seal hunting
