= Marine Industries =

Canadian shipbuilder and rolling stock manufacturer

Marine Industries Ltd.
- Industry: Shipbuilding, Rail car manufacturing, Hydro-Electric Generators and Turbines
- Founded: 1937
- Defunct: 1988
- Fate: Merged and then closed
- Successor: MIL-Davie Shipbuilding
- Headquarters: Sorel-Tracy, Quebec, Canada
- Products: Cargo liners; Coastal tankers; Fishing vessels; Research vessels; Ferries; Naval vessels; Icebreakers; Railroad cars; Hydro generators and turbines
- Number of employees: c. 8,500

Marine Industries Limited (MIL) was a Canadian ship building, hydro-electric and rail car manufacturing company, in Sorel-Tracy, Quebec, with a shipyard located on the Richelieu river about 1 km from the St. Lawrence River. It employed up to 8,500 people during the World War II support effort.

Opened in 1937 by the Simard family after taking over the smaller Manseau Shipyard, the yards early contracts were tugs and coastal tankers used on the Great Lakes and Canada's Atlantic coast. In the 1940s, MIL built 11 British Corvettes, beginning a growth as one of the most significant exporter of ships in Canada's shipbuilding history, with exports to Britain, France, USA, Venezuela, Greece, Holland, Indonesia, Cuba and Poland. This required a major modernisation of the yard in the early 1960s plus the growth of a significant in-house design capacity to create what became known as MARINDUS designs, from which 45 ships were built of 9 unique designs for coasters, fishing vessels, tankers and cargo liners. MIL also began building railroad cars in 1957, with production focused mainly on flat cars, gondolas and covered hoppers for the domestic and export markets and then opened a Hydro-Electric Division in the 1960s that designed and built generators and turbines for numerous projects in Quebec (Churchill Falls, Outardes, Manicouagan, La Grande etc.) with smaller ones in Ecuador and India.

In 1986 the federal government asked Quebec to rationalize its shipyards, which saw MIL merge with Davie Shipbuilding in Lauzon; the Sorel shipyard was called M.I.L. Tracy (for Tracy, Quebec) and the Lauzon shipyard was called M.I.L. Lauzon.

Not long after the merger, the new company MIL Davie Shipbuilding closed the Sorel shipyard (in 1988) along with the Versatile Vickers shipyard in Montreal, resulting in a total loss of 1,700 jobs. The shipyard buildings were demolished, drydock still visible and Structure D'Acier DMR Incorporated now operating at the site.

== Ships built ==
Starting with the largest marine railway in North American in the early 1900s, MIL went on to build numerous key vessels to earn a special place in Canada's shipbuilding history, by building Canada's first all-welded steel ship (1935), Canada's first all-welded aluminum boats in 1950, 13 Liberty-style ships a year during the war effort (1941-3), largest diesel-electric icebreaking railcar ferry (Abegweit 1947), the first icebreaker to sail through the NW Passage both ways (Labrador 1954), the record-breaking all aluminum Bras d'Or Hydrofoil hull (for DeHaviland 1967) and the then largest floating crane in N.America (1961) plus several record breaking fishing boats and the extensive MARINDUS series (noted above) for export. The Sorel shipyard was also responsible for numerous Royal Canadian Navy, Canadian Coast Guard and CN Marine vessels as well as some 300 commercial ships of over 50 different types. Of these, only ships built for various Canadian Government services are listed below.

=== Warships ===
- Flower-class corvette
  - HMCS Arrowhead
  - HMCS Bittersweet
  - HMCS Calgary
  - HMCS Camrose
  - HMCS Dunvegan
  - HMCS Fennel
  - HMCS Fredericton
  - HMCS La Malbaie
  - HMCS Regina
  - HMCS Sherbrooke
  - HMCS Sorel
- St. Laurent-class destroyer
  - HMCS Assiniboine
- Restigouche-class destroyer
  - HMCS St. Croix
- Annapolis-class destroyer
  - HMCS Nipigon
- Iroquois-class destroyer
  - HMCS Iroquois
  - HMCS Huron
- Unclassed hydrofoil
  - HMCS Bras d'Or

=== Icebreakers ===
- A.T Cameron (1958) - built for the federal Fisheries Research Board, sold and renamed Arctic Ranger and RV Arctic Discoverer
- CCGS Sir William Alexander
- CCGS Labrador
- CCGS Bartlett
- CCGS Edward Cornwallis

=== Coast Guard vessels ===
- CCGS Tupper

=== Ferries ===
- MV Howe Sound Queen - car and passenger ferry built as MV Napoleon L in 1964 and sold to BC Ferries in 1971 (hull unknown)
- MV Abegweit (1947)
- MV John Hamilton Gray
- MV Ambrose Shea (1967) - built for CN Marine, car and passenger ferry was transferred to Marine Atlantic; sold and renamed MV Erg and scrapped
- MV Camille-Marcoux (1974) - car ferry for Government of Quebec and operated route from Matane–Baie-Comeau–Godbout - scrapped 2017

=== Floating dry dock ===
- Panamax drydock 1982; acquired by Halifax Shipyard and renamed Novadock
