= Bell 429 GlobalRanger =

American utility helicopter

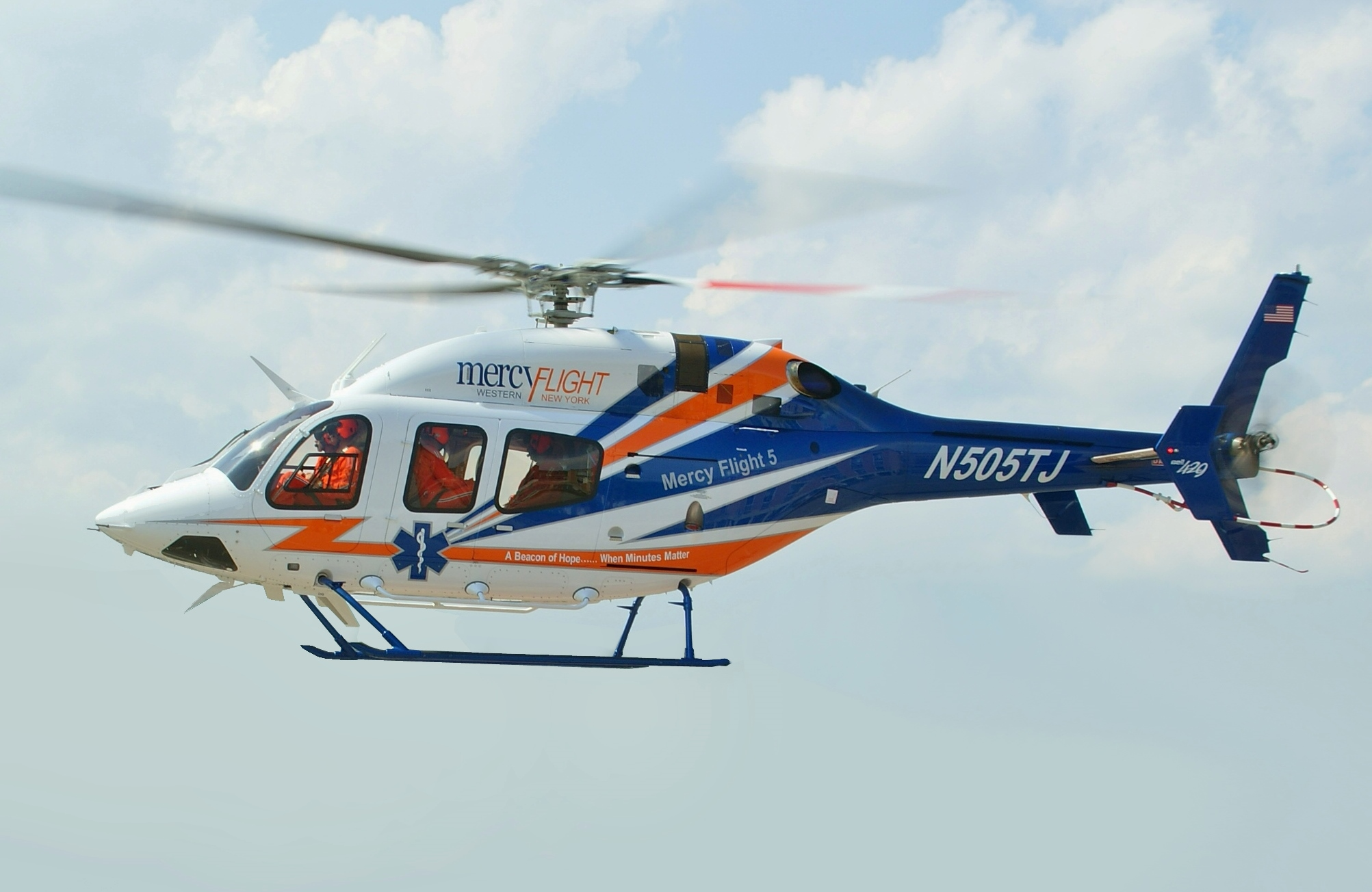
- A Bell 429 from Mercy Flight 5

General information
- Type: Multipurpose utility helicopter
- National origin: United States/Canada/South Korea
- Manufacturer: Bell Helicopter
- Status: In service
- Primary users: Canadian Coast Guard Royal Australian Navy (historical); Swedish Police; Delaware State Police
- Number built: 500 (July 2024)

History
- Manufactured: 2007–present
- Introduction date: 2009
- First flight: February 27, 2007
- Developed from: Bell 427

The Bell 429 GlobalRanger is a light, twin-engine helicopter developed by Bell Helicopter and Korea Aerospace Industries. The first flight of the prototype took place on February 27, 2007, and the aircraft received type certification on July 1, 2009. The Bell 429 is capable of single-pilot IFR and Runway Category A operations.

== Development ==
The impetus for developing the Bell 429 came primarily from the emergency medical services (EMS) industry. The Bell 427 was originally intended to address this market, but the 427's small cabin size would not adequately accommodate a patient litter, and the systems did not support instrument flight rules (IFR) certification. Bell's original concept for the 429 was a stretched model 427 (unveiled as the Bell 427s3i at the 2004 HAI helicopter show), but this still did not provide what Bell and its customer advisers were looking for.

Bell abandoned the 427 airframe and went to its MAPL (Modular Affordable Product Line) concept airframe that was still in conceptual development at the time. The 429 employs the all-new modular airframe concept and the advanced rotor blade design from the MAPL program, but maintains a derivative engine and rotor drive system from the 427. The basic model includes a glass cockpit and is certified for single pilot IFR. Bell partnered with Korea Aerospace Industries and Mitsui Bussan Aerospace of Japan in the helicopter's development.

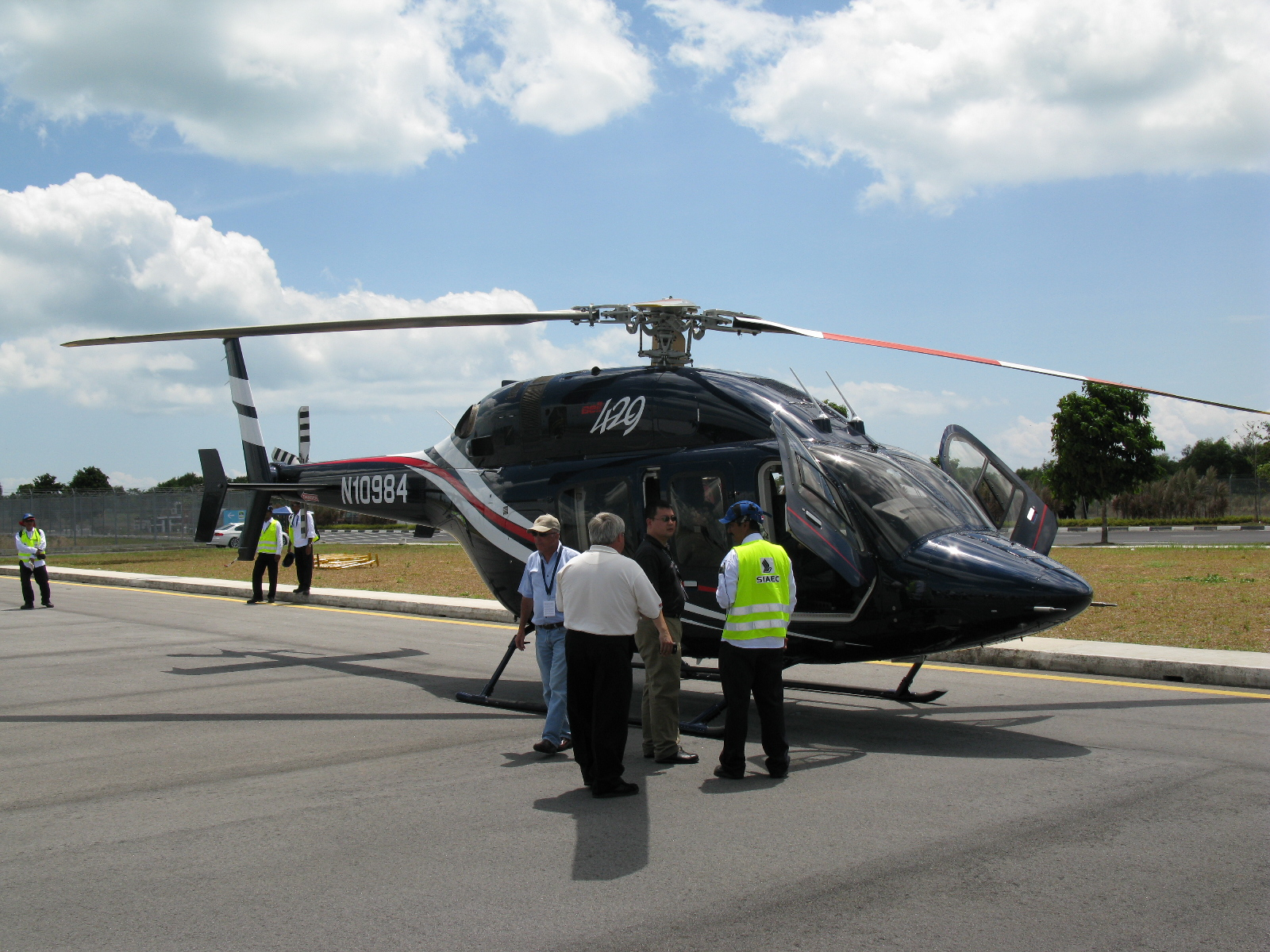
Bell 429 at the Singapore Air Show 2010

Bell had flown most of the critical MAPL technology components, using a 427 testbed aircraft, by February 2006. The first completed 429 flew on February 27, 2007. Certification was originally planned for late 2007, but program schedule delays, primarily caused by parts and material shortages common to all aviation manufacturers in that time period, caused the manufacturer to stretch the development timetable. In October 2007, the external configuration was set. In February 2008, Bell had three 429s in flight testing that had completed 600 flight hours. Its high-altitude testing was conducted in Colorado and its high-temperature testing in Arizona.

The helicopter received type certification from Transport Canada Civil Aviation (TCCA) on July 1, 2009, and from the Federal Aviation Administration (FAA) by July 7, 2009. EASA certification was announced at Helitech on September 24, 2009. TCCA and authorities in some other countries later approved an increased weight exemption for the aircraft. However, FAA and EASA disagreed with the weight exemption, which had allowed the 429 to operate for the Canadian Coast Guard.

As of June 2009, the Bell 429 had received over 301 letters of intent. The launch customer was Air Methods Corporation, the largest medevac provider in the United States, which took one helicopter. On July 7, 2009, this aircraft (s/n 57006) was delivered to Air Methods (owner) and MercyOne (operator) at Bell's facility in Mirabel, Quebec.

== Design ==
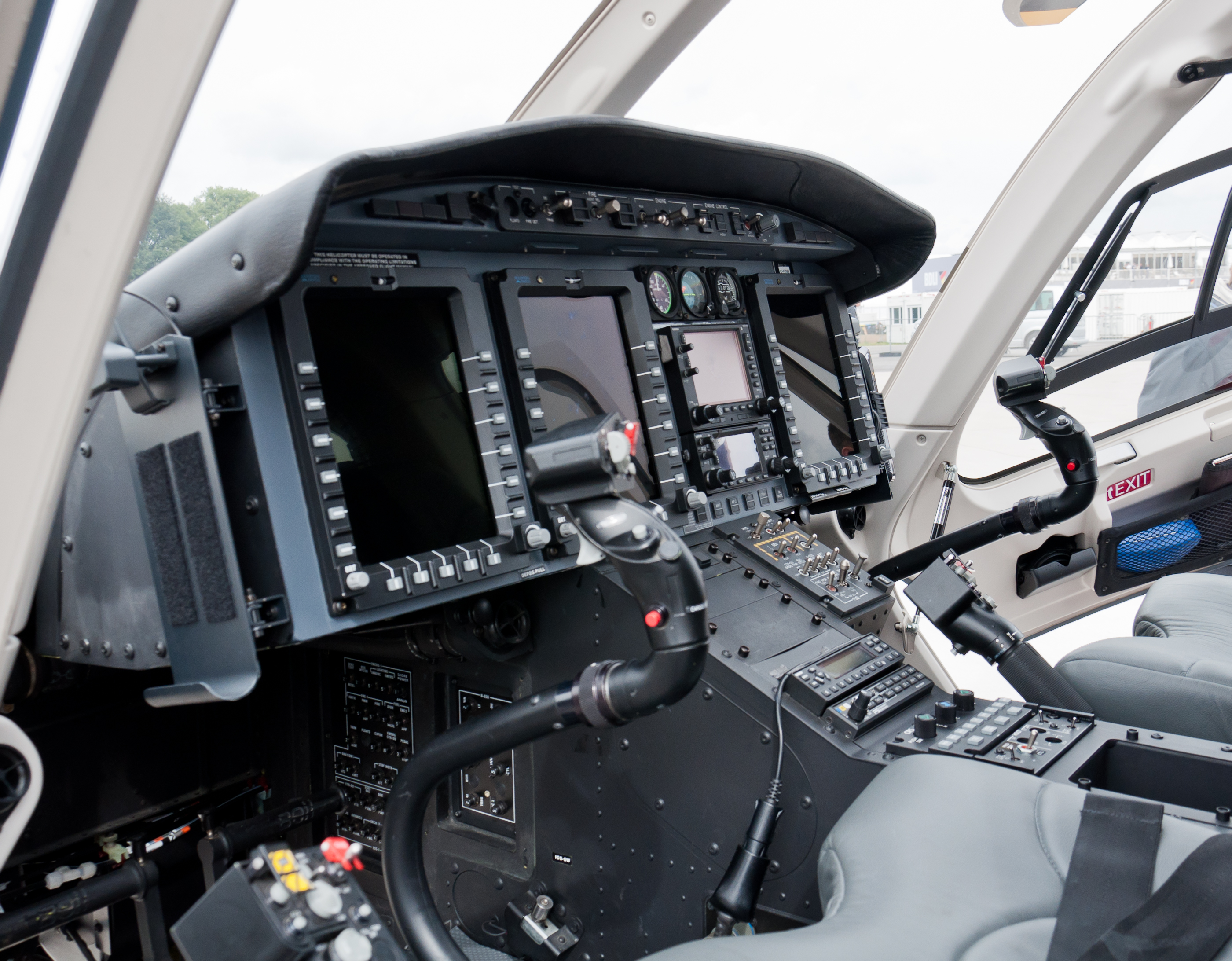
Bell 429 cockpit

The Bell 429 has a four-blade rotor system with soft-in-plane flex beams. The rotor blades are composite and have swept tips for reduced noise. The tail rotor is made by stacking two two-blade rotors set at uneven intervals (to form an X) for reduced noise. The combined cabin volume is 204 ft^{3} (5.8 m^{3}) with a 130 ft^{3} (3.7 m^{3}) passenger cabin and 74 ft^{3} (2.1 m^{3}) baggage area, with a flat floor for patient loading. A set of rear clamshell doors under the tailboom is optional for easier patient loading in EMS operations.

The 429 has a glass cockpit with a three-axis autopilot (optional fourth axis kit) and flight director as standard. Standard landing gear are skids. A retractable wheel landing gear is optional and adds five knots to cruising speed. The helicopter is categorized as a single-pilot IFR Category A. It is capable of operating with one engine inoperative. The main transmission is rated for 5,000 hours between overhauls and the tail rotor gearbox is rated for 3,200 hours.

== Operational history ==
By July 2018, 325 aircraft had operated 330,000 hours for police forces, air medical teams, and militaries in 42 countries, including Australia, France, Indonesia, Kuwait, Oman, Switzerland, Slovakia, Sweden, Turkey, Thailand, the United States, and the United Kingdom.

== Operators ==
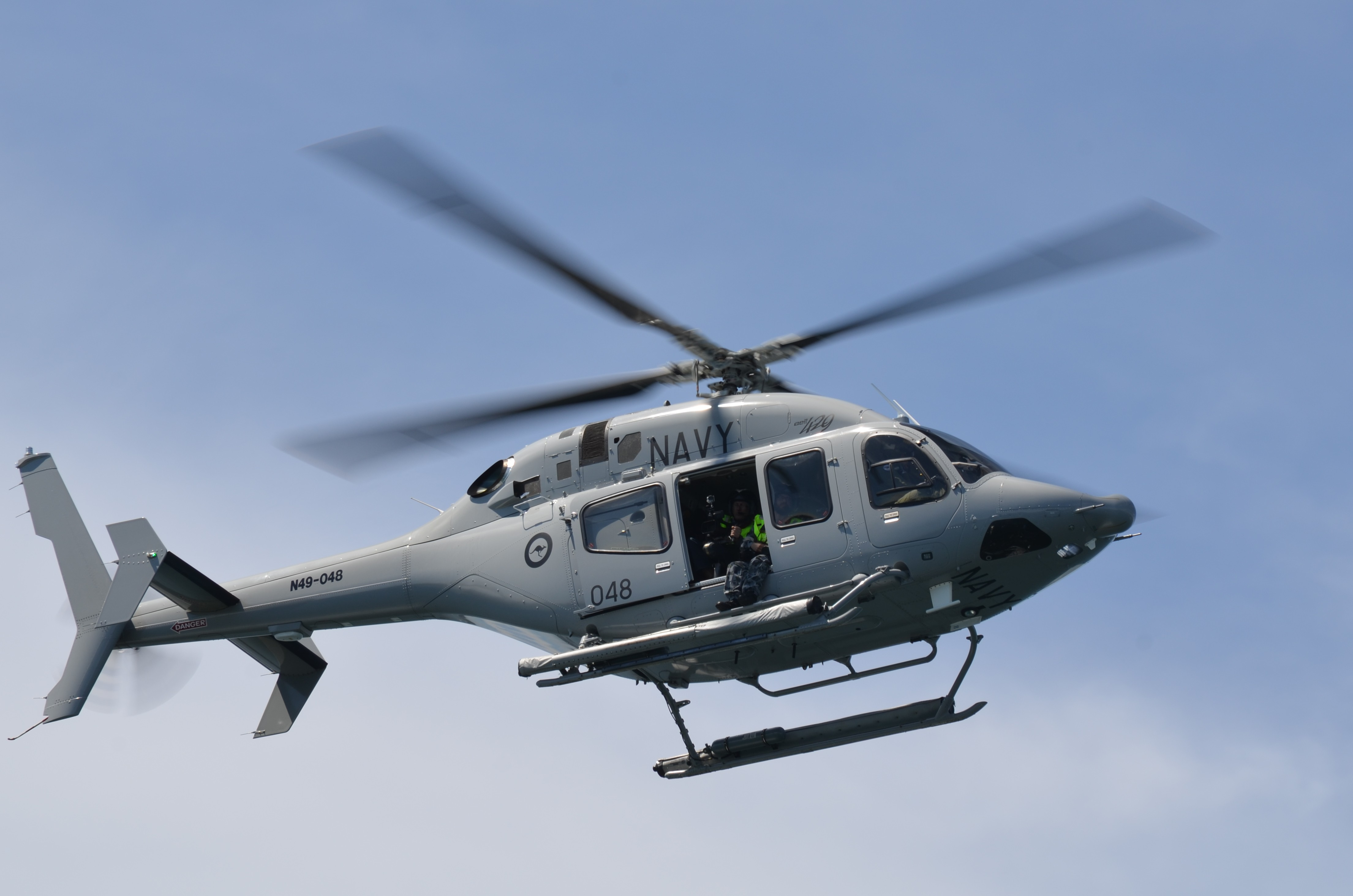
A Royal Australian Navy Bell 429

=== Military and government operators ===
Argentina

- Government of Corrientes - 2
- Entre Ríos Provincial Police - 1
- Government of Santa Fe - 1
- Government of San Juan - 1
- Government of Tucumán - 1
- Government of Salta - 1
- Government of Neuquén - 1

Australia

- NSW Police Force
- Royal Australian Navy
  - 723 Squadron RAN - 3
- Queensland Police Service - 3

Canada

- Canadian Coast Guard - 16

Indonesia

- Indonesian National Police
  - Directorate of Air Police of the National Police Security Maintenance Agency - 2

Jamaica

- Jamaica Defence Force - 5

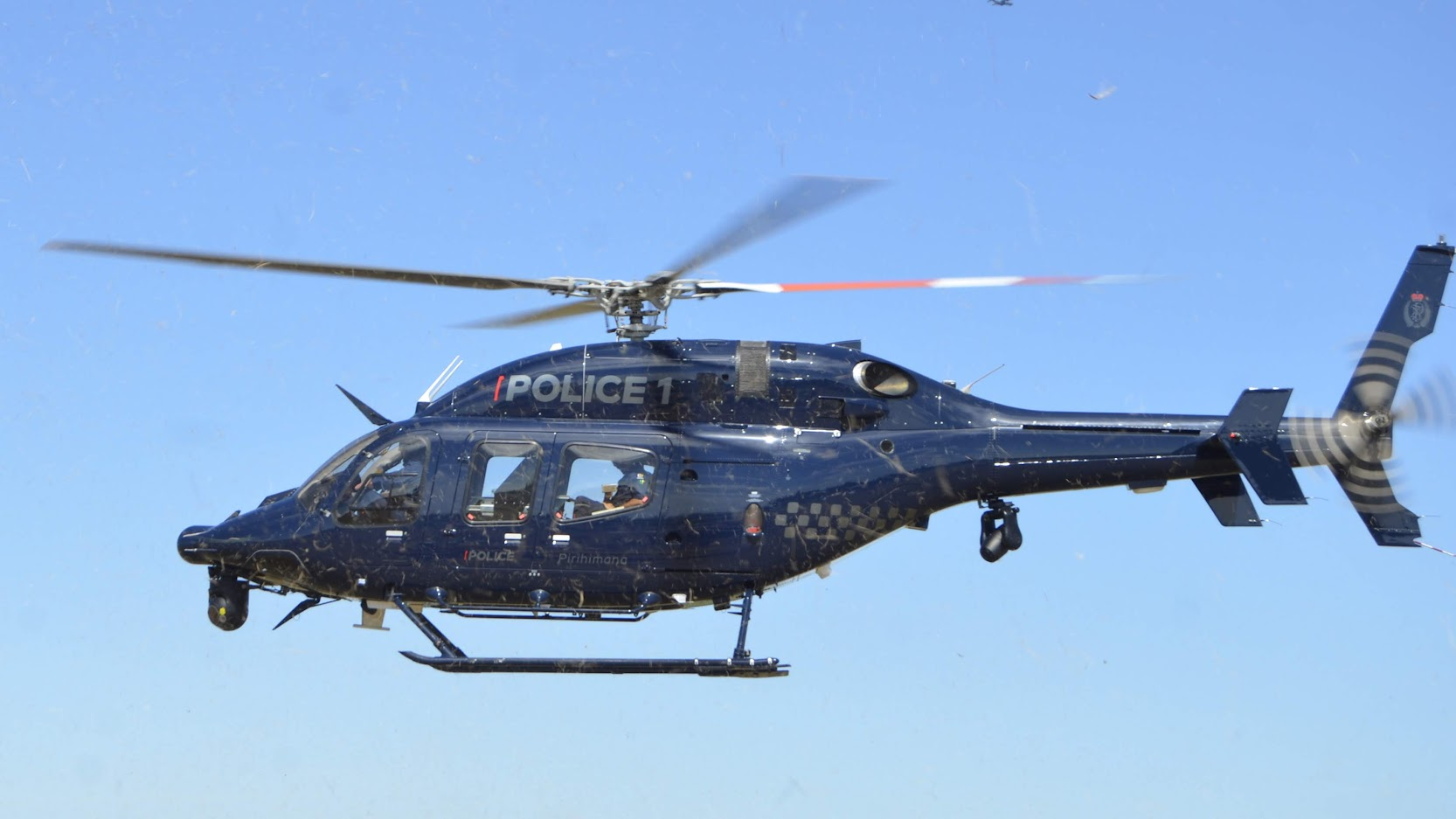
A Bell 429 of the New Zealand police

New Zealand

- New Zealand Police - 3

Oman

- Ministry of Defence - 5

Philippines

- Philippine National Police - 1 unit Crashed on 5 March 2020.

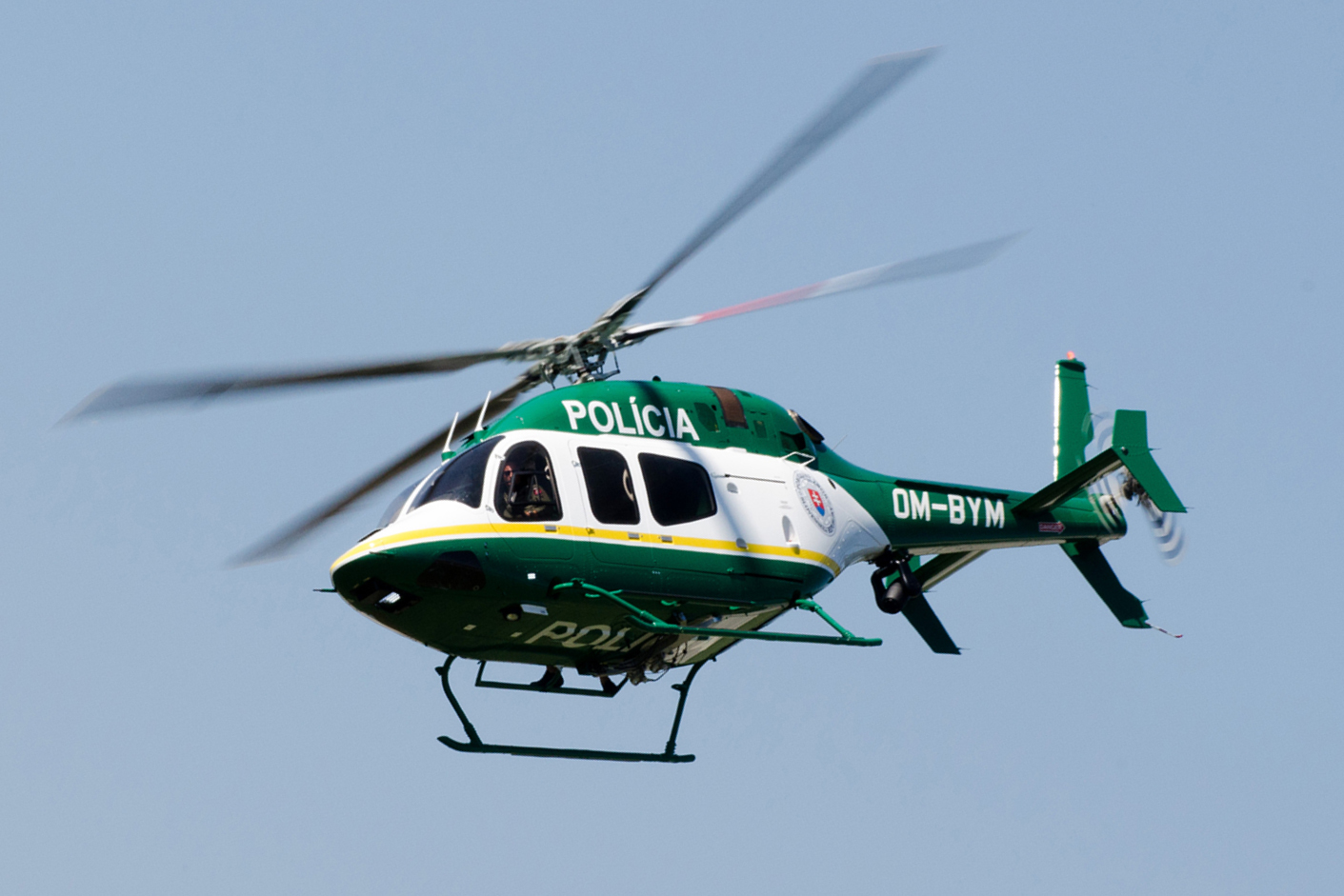
A Bell 429 of the Slovak police

Slovakia

- Slovak Police Force - 4 (one crashed)

Sweden

- Swedish Police Authority - 9 (7 ordered in 2014 and 2 in 2018)

Thailand

- Royal Thai Police - 6

Turkey

- General Directorate of Security

United Kingdom

- Wiltshire Air Ambulance - 1

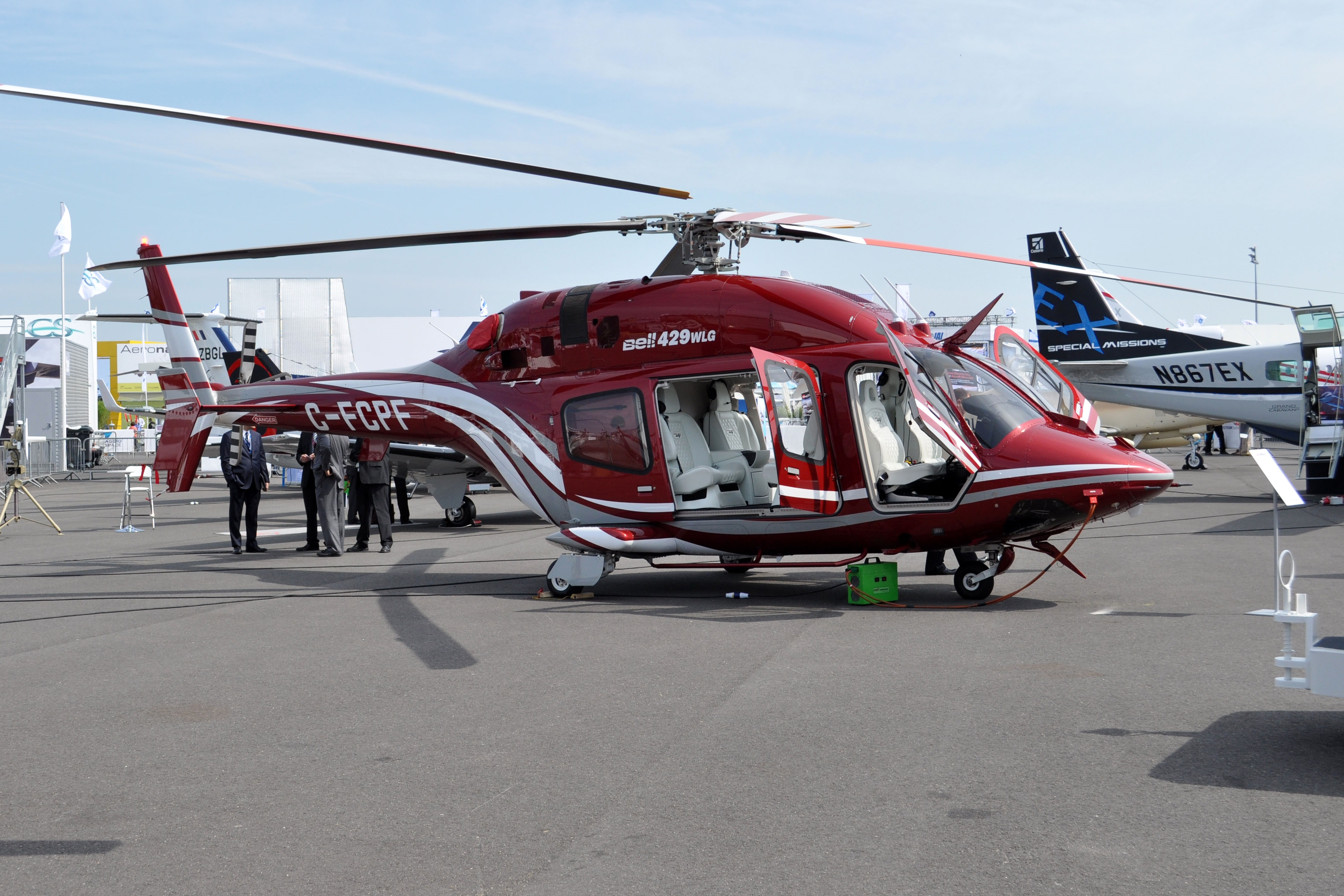
Bell 429 with retractable wheel landing gear

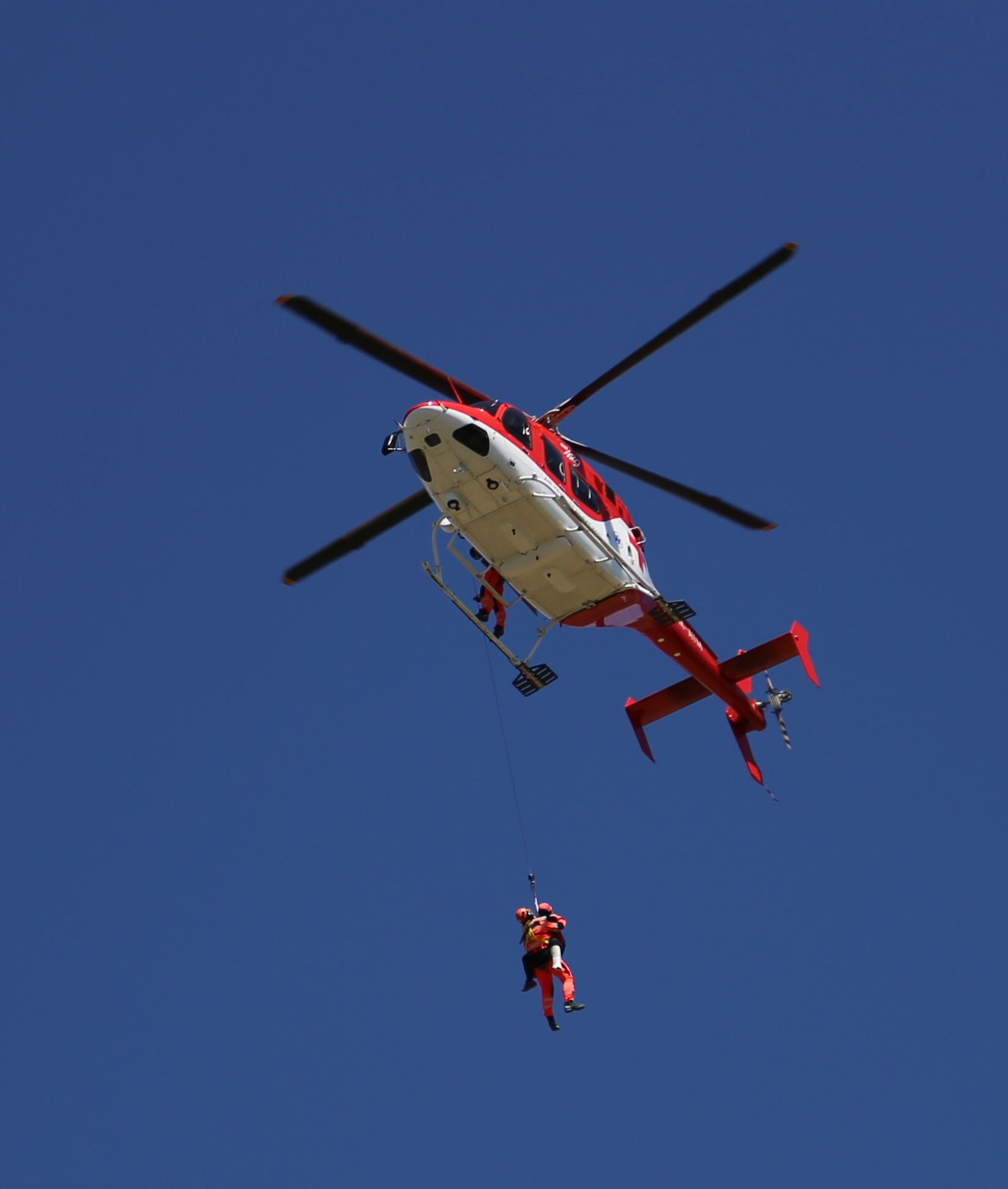
Bell 429 during rescue operation in Tatra mountains

United States

- Arizona Department of Public Safety - 1
- Cook County Sheriff's Office - 1
- Delaware State Police - 4
- Fairfax County Police Department - 2
- Honolulu Fire Department - 1
- New York City Police Department - 1
- Puerto Rico Department of Health - 1
- Minnesota State Patrol - 1
- Tennessee Valley Authority - 3

Tunisia

- Tunisian National Guard - 3

=== Other operators ===
Australia

- Blesk Aviation

== Specifications (Bell 429) ==
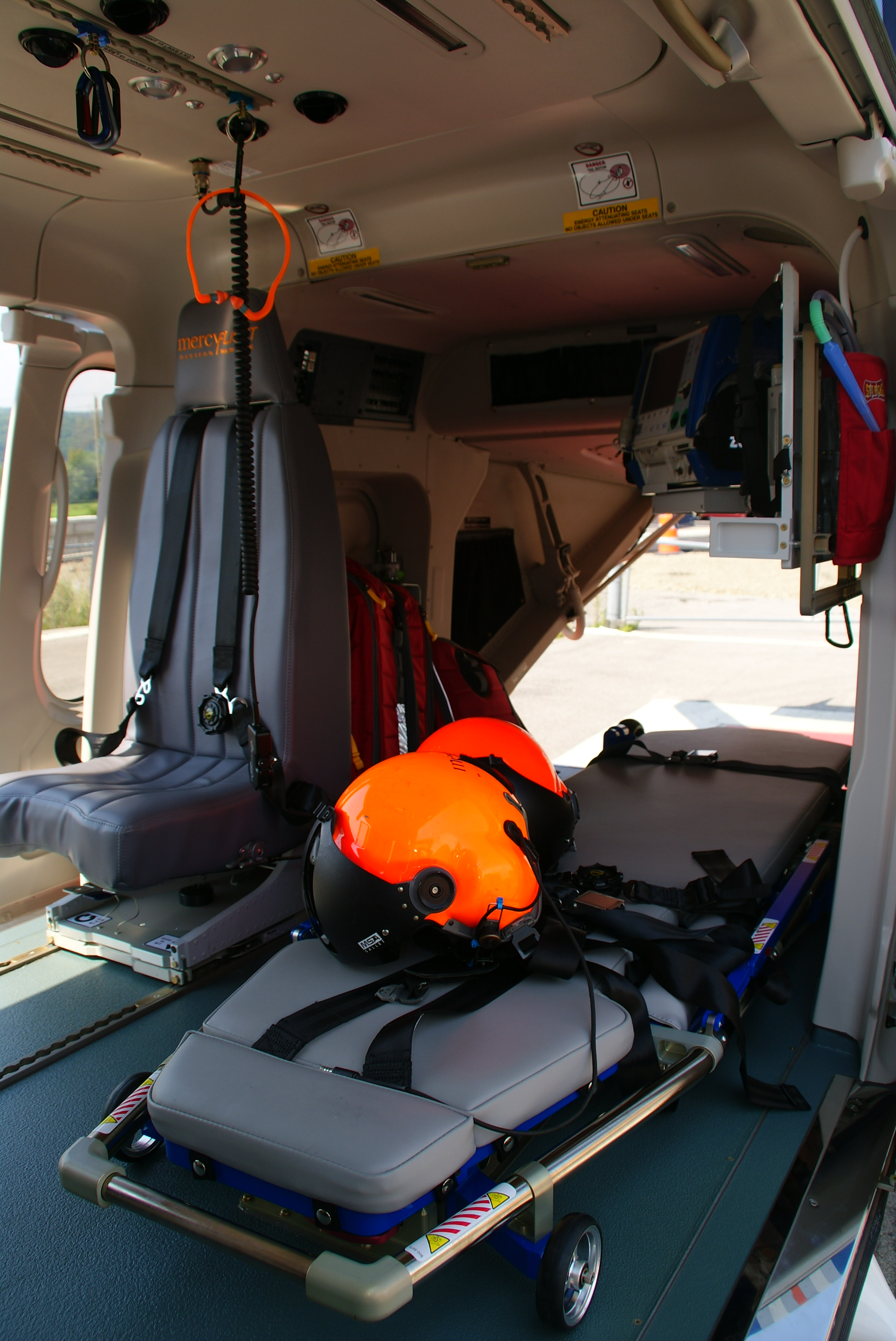
Cabin of a medical evacuation Bell 429

Data from Bell 429 brochure, Bell Helicopter 429 product specifications, Flug Revue Bell 429 page, Aviation Week

General characteristics

- Crew: 1 pilot
- Capacity: 7 passengers (six in passenger compartment; one beside pilot) / 2,755 lb (1,250 kg) payload
- Length: 41 ft 8 in (12.70 m)
- Height: 13 ft 3 in (4.04 m)
- Cabin volume: 204 ft^{3} (5.78 m^{3})
- Empty weight: 4,245 lb (1,925 kg)
- Max takeoff weight: 7,500 lb (3,402 kg)
- Fuel capacity: 215 US gal (179 imp gal; 814 L) usable with 40 US gal (33 imp gal; 151 L) auxiliary fuel
- Powerplant: 2 × Pratt & Whitney Canada PW207D1 (or PW207D2 with fuel heater installed) turboshaft, 625 shp (466 kW) each maximum continuous

730 shp (544 kW) for take-off

- Main rotor diameter: 36 ft (11 m)
- Main rotor area: 1,018 sq ft (94.6 m^{2})
- Blade section: - Narramore

Performance

- Cruise speed: 150 kn (170 mph, 280 km/h)
- Never exceed speed: 155 kn (178 mph, 287 km/h)
- Range: 390 nmi (450 mi, 720 km)
- Service ceiling: 20,000 ft (6,100 m)
- Hover ceiling IGE: 14,130 ft (4,307 m)
- Hover ceiling OGE: 11,280 ft (3,438 m)

== See also ==
Related development

- Bell 427

Aircraft of comparable role, configuration, and era

- Airbus Helicopters H135
- Airbus Helicopters H140
- AgustaWestland AW109
- AVIC AC332
- HAL Light Utility Helicopter
- MD Helicopters MD Explorer
