= List of Douglas A-26 Invader operators =

The List of Douglas A-26 Invader operators lists the nations, their air force units, and civilian companies that have operated the Douglas A-26 Invader (re-designated B-26 Invader after 1947):

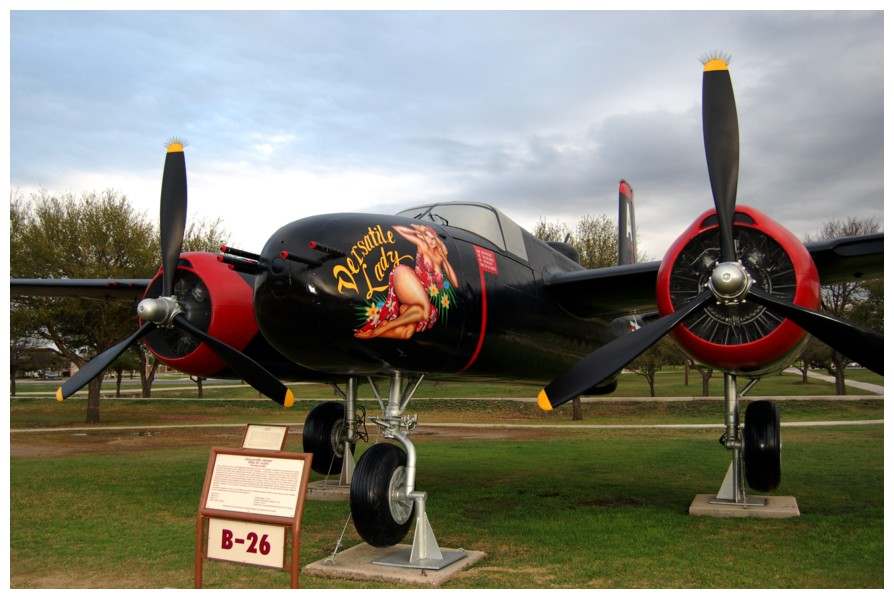
A-26C-50-DT 44-35918 marked as A-26B 434287 "Versatile Lady" at USAF Airman Heritage Museum

== Military operators ==
=== Angola ===
Angolan Air Force

The Angolan Air Force operated two B-26 from the six inherited from the Portuguese Air Force. Until then, these aircraft were operated by the Squadron 91 of the Portuguese Air Force in Angola, based at Luanda Air Base. When the independence of Angola in 1975, Portugal offered the aircraft to the new country.

=== Biafra ===
Biafran Air Force

Biafra acquired and used (at least) two provisionally armed B-26s during the Nigerian Civil War. Former French Air Force (of the CEV test centre) B-26R, USAAF serial 41-39531, put up for sale, 11 July 1966. Registered to Pan Eurasian Trading Company, Luxembourg, 2 August 1966 (N64Y?) as "an investment," never operated; "resold to a Mr Ernest A. Koenig – a German-American residing in Luxembourg." It seems very likely that Mr Koenig acted as an agent for Eastern Nigeria, and one source claims that the real buyer was a "French company, which paid good money for the aircraft." It has been claimed that the Biafrans (who had purchasing agents in France) ended up paying as much as $320,000 for it. Although there is no direct evidence for contacts between Mr Koenig and the Eastern Nigerians at this stage, it should be mentioned that he was later also involved in the sale of C-47s to Biafra.

In late October, Koenig had the Invader placed on the U.S. register as N12756, the airframe stored at Courtrai-Wevelghem in Belgium. Taken out of storage and prepped for delivery to Africa in early June 1967. Ferried to Lisbon by Belgian pilot in mid-June. Departed Lisbon 26 June, flown by former French CEV pilot and ex-Polish squadron co-pilot, arriving at Biafran capital Enugu on 29 June 1967. Known as "The Shark" with a crudely applied shark's mouth and a single nose-mounted machine gun, it was abandoned at Enugu on 4 October 1967 in a damaged condition.

A second former French Invader, RB-26P, USAAF 44-34312, registered F-BMJR, one of five sold to aerial survey company Société Carta by the Armée de l'Air in 1966, and last seen at Creil near Paris in June 1967, was flown to Biafra in August 1967 by two American pilots. "It was sold to Biafra through the French arms dealer Pierre Laureys, who had also been involved in the sale of the first Invader." (Some reports claim that an Invader carrying the bogus registration N1888T was delivered to Biafra. There might be possibly some connection with this RB-26P.)

It was painted in a similar camouflage scheme to the first B-26, but with no shark's mouth. It commenced operations using locally produced ordnance until damaged in accident 2 December 1967 and grounded. Abandoned at Port Harcourt in damaged condition due to a lack of spares. Captured by Nigerian forces 18 May 1968, it damaged sufficiently by BAF commandos on 19 May 1968 to prevent operation.

Neither Invader received a BAF serial.

=== Brazil ===
Brazilian Air Force

- B-26B FAB 5145, 41-39246, taken on charge September 1957, refurbished 1968, withdrawn from use, stricken 1975.
- B-26B FAB 5146, 43-22469, taken on charge September 1957, struck off charge 14 July 1967, crashed on T-O at Natal.
- B-26B FAB 5147, 43-22496, taken on charge September 1957, refurbished 1968, withdrawn from use, struck off charge 1975.
- B-26B FAB 5148, 43-22597, taken on charge September 1957, struck off charge 5 August 1965, written-off at Natal.
- B-26B FAB 5149, B-26C FAB 5149, 44-34163, taken on charge 1957, refurbished 1968 into B-26C, withdrawn from use, struck off charge April 1974.
- B-26B FAB 5150, 44-34196, taken on charge 1957, refurbished 1968, withdrawn from use, struck off charge 1975.
- B-26B FAB 5151, 44-34207, taken on charge 1957, written off at Natal, struck off charge, 9 August 1965.
- B-26B FAB 5152, 44-34208, taken on charge 1957, withdrawn from use and struck off charge January 1975.
- B-26B FAB 5153, 44-35235, taken on charge 1957, refurbished 1968, withdrawn from use, struck off charge 1975.
- B-26B FAB 5154, 44-35405, taken on charge 1957, written off 13 June 1958, São José de Mipibu, SP state.
- B-26B FAB 5155, 44-35415, taken on charge 1957, written off 28 September 1965, Niquelândia, GO state.
- B-26B FAB 5156, 44-35586, taken on charge 1957, refurbished 1968, withdrawn from use, struck off charge December 1975. Was displayed at FAB Academy in 1 o/ 10 o GAv markings. Transferred to Parnamirim in 1987.
- B-26B FAB 5157, 44-35610, taken on charge 1957, refurbished 1968, withdrawn from use, struck off charge December 1973.
- B-26B FAB 5158, 44-35713, taken on charge 1957, refurbished 1968, withdrawn from use, struck off charge August 1972.
- B-26C FAB 5159, B-26B FAB 5159, 41-39288, taken on charge 1957, refurbished 1968 into B-26B. Withdrawn from use, now displayed at Museu Aeroespacial, Campo dos Afonsos, near Rio de Janeiro.
- B-26C FAB 5160, B-26B FAB 5160, 43-22271, taken on charge 1957, refurbished 1968 into B-26B. Withdrawn from use, struck off charge December 1975.
- B-26C FAB 5161, 43-22415, taken on charge 1958, to have been refurbished 1968 but found to be too badly corroded. Withdrawn from use, struck off charge June 1968.
- B-26C FAB 5162, 43-22456, taken on charge 1958, refurbished 1968, withdrawn from use, struck off charge 1975.
- B-26C FAB 5163, 43-22457, taken on charge 1958, withdrawn from use, struck of charge October 1967.
- B-26C FAB 5164, 43-22461, taken on charge 1958, withdrawn from use, struck off charge June 1968.
- B-26C FAB 5165, 43-22472, taken on charge 1958, withdrawn from use, struck off charge October 1967.
- B-26C FAB 5166, 43-22477, taken on charge 1958, withdrawn from use, struck off charge June 1968.
- B-26C FAB 5167, 43-22605, taken on charge 1958, written off at Caravelas, BA state, 10 June 1963.
- B-26C FAB 5168, 44-34120, taken on charge 1958, withdrawn from use, struck off charge June 1968.
- B-26C FAB 5169, 44-34329, taken on charge 1958, withdrawn from use, struck off charge June 1968.
- B-26C FAB 5170, B-26B FAB 5170, 44-35264, taken on charge February 1958, refurbished 1969 into B-26B. Withdrawn from use, struck off charge December 1975.
- B-26C FAB 5171, B-26B FAB 5171, 44-35790, taken on charge February 1958, refurbished 1968 still as B-26C, but later reconfigured into B-26B in Brazil. Withdrawn from use, struck off charge December 1975.
- B-26C FAB 5172, 44-35902, taken on charge February 1958, refurbished 1968, withdrawn from use, struck off charge December 1975.
- B-26C FAB 5173, 44-34615, N4817E, taken on charge June 1969, withdrawn from use between 1973 and 1975, struck off charge circa 1974.
- B-26C FAB 5174, 44-34749, N4823E, taken on charge June 1969, withdrawn from use, struck off charge December 1975, originally preserved at ESPAer near São Paulo but sold back to USA as N4823E circa 1984.
- B-26C FAB 5175, 44-35969, N8628E, taken on charge June 1969, withdrawn from use, struck off charge December 1975.
- CB-26 FAB 5176, later C-26 FAB 5176, 44-34134, N115RG, N4974N, civilian aircraft impounded 21 June 1966, taken on charge 1970, used as a transport, withdrawn from use, struck off charge January 1975, preserved with Museu de Armas e Veiculos Motorizidos Antigos, Bebedouro, SP state.

FAB Invaders were redesignated from B-26 to A-26 in 1970, FAB 5176 being the exception.

=== Chile ===
Chilean Air Force

=== Colombia ===
Colombian Air Force

=== Cuba ===
Cuban Air Force

From 1956, two B-26Bs and 16 B-26Cs were operated, but were retired in 1961 due to attrition and a shortage of parts, and were replaced by Soviet-made aircraft.

=== Democratic Republic of the Congo ===
Air Force of the Democratic Republic of the Congo

=== Dominican Republic ===
Dominican Republic Air Force

=== El Salvador ===
El Salvador Air Force

=== France ===
French Air Force

=== Guatemala ===
Guatemalan Air Force

=== Honduras ===
Honduran Air Force

"The last Latin American air arm to acquire a B-26, and place the type in active combat-configured service, Honduras also holds the distinction of being the very last air arm to operate the type anywhere."

=== Indonesia ===
Indonesian Air Force

Six surplus B-26s were purchased in 1959, delivered in 1960. The aircraft provided close air support missions during the Indonesian invasion of East Timor in December 1975–spring 1977, which is also the last combat sorties of Invaders in the world. Indonesian B-26 Invaders were retired in December 1977.

=== Mexico ===
Mexican Air Force

A single A-26 was purchased on behalf of the President of Mexico in 1949 for operation as a presidential transport. Although maintained by the Mexican Air Force, it had a civil Aircraft registration. In 1962, it was replaced as a presidential aircraft, and was used by the commander of the Mexican Air Force, with full military markings and registration.

=== Nicaragua ===
Nicaraguan Air Force

=== Peru ===
Peruvian Air Force

=== Portugal ===
Portuguese Air Force

The need for a replacement for the bomber and close air support fleet in Africa during the Colonial War, composed of the PV-2 Harpoon and of the F-84G Thunderjet, led to the procurement by the Portuguese Air Force of a new bomber in the mid-sixties. But it would prove difficult to acquire new aircraft because of the United Nations arms embargo then in force against Portugal, so special methods had to be used. In late 1964, with the decision made to acquire the B-26 Invader a contact was established with an arms broker in order to try to obtain 20 B-26 Invader aircraft.

The arms dealer, Luber SA in Geneva, signed an agreement with Aero Associates of Arizona to supply 20 aircraft that would be refurbished by Hamilton Aircraft. The first B-26 would be delivered by 30 April 1965 and the last one by January 1966. Besides the aircraft, a lot of spare parts and accessories would also be included in the purchase.

It is not clear how the export licenses were obtained, but in May 1965 the first aircraft, piloted by John Hawke, was ferried from Tucson to Tancos, Portugal, through Rochester, Torbay, Canada, and Santa Maria, Azores. By August 1965, seven aircraft had already been delivered.

In September the U.S. Customs arrested Hawke and other people involved in the arms deal and prevented a C-46 transporting spare parts to Portugal from leaving the United States.

In December 1966, with only seven B-26 bombers and their provisions for armament, although without armament, the decision was made to equip the aircraft with the following: six .50 cal Browning M2 machine guns on the nose; two suspension points 50 or 200 kg bombs, and equipment for releasing 15 kg bombs, on the bomb-bay; and two suspension points per wing, allowing the alternate or combined use of two 200 kg bombs or six 50 kg bombs.

The installation of rocket launchers under the wings was also possible, thus allowing the use of four rockets of 2.5", 18 rockets of 37 mm, or 36 of 37 mm per point.

Until 1970 it was very difficult to start operating all the seven aircraft due to the lack of spare parts, however, at least it was possible to begin operational testing with three aircraft. That same year these three first B-26 were sent to Guinea-Bissau as a detachment to test the aircraft in a tropical climate.

Meanwhile, efforts to try to obtain the spare parts and armament continued. Many contacts and visits were made with other countries operating the B-26, including at least one visit to Brazil that was also operating the A-26 at the time. In September 1967, one of the first contacts took place with a visit to Chateaudun, France, during which 13 former-French Air Force were offered for sale, including seven aircraft equipped with radar. All of the aircraft had between 3,000 and 8,000 flight hours in total. The offer was rejected, probably due to the state of the aircraft.

Other spontaneous offers were also received; one of them was the proposal of six former-Guatemalan Air Force B-26 in January 1971, by US$950,000 each. Mentioned was also the possibility of obtaining former-Nicaraguan B-26. These offers were also rejected.

In 1971 the complete refurbishment of the seven aircraft started at the OGMA workshops with spare parts obtained from France. The bombers were completely stripped down, the wing-spars reinforced and the armament installed. In addition the read windows were covered. By November 1971, all aircraft had been refurbished except for the 7104 that was scrapped due to heavy corrosion found when the stripping started.

The next year, 1972, many testing trips were made to Azores, Madeira and Canary Islands. In 1973 all the six aircraft were sent to Angola to replace F-84G fighters of 93 Squadron.

The aircraft operated until 1975, mainly for armed reconnaissance. After the war all six were left in Angola. Later one B-26 was taken to Cuba, reportedly 7101.

Designation	USAAF Serial	PoAF Serial	Delivery	Retired	In Service	Notes
B-26B-60/61-DL	44-34535	7101	May 1965	1975	26 April 1971	Solid nose
B-26B-55/65-DL	44-34328	7102	1965	1975	January 1972	Equipped with Plexiglas nose
B-26C-40-DT	44-35631	7103	1965	1975	November 1971	Solid nose
B-26B-66-DL	44-34726	7104	1965	1973	26 September 1967	Scrapped by decision of March 1973. Some parts preserved for the Air Force Air Museum
B-26B-20-DT	43-22427	7105	1965	1975	September 1971	
B-26B-40-DL	41-39517	7106	1965	1975	28 July 1969	
B-26C-35-DT	44-35363	7107	1965	1975	9 September 1970	

Portuguese Air Force

- "Diabos", testing detachment located in Portugal and at Bissau, Portuguese Guinea
- 91 Squadron, bomber and close air support squadron based at Luanda, Angola

=== Saudi Arabia ===
Royal Saudi Air Force

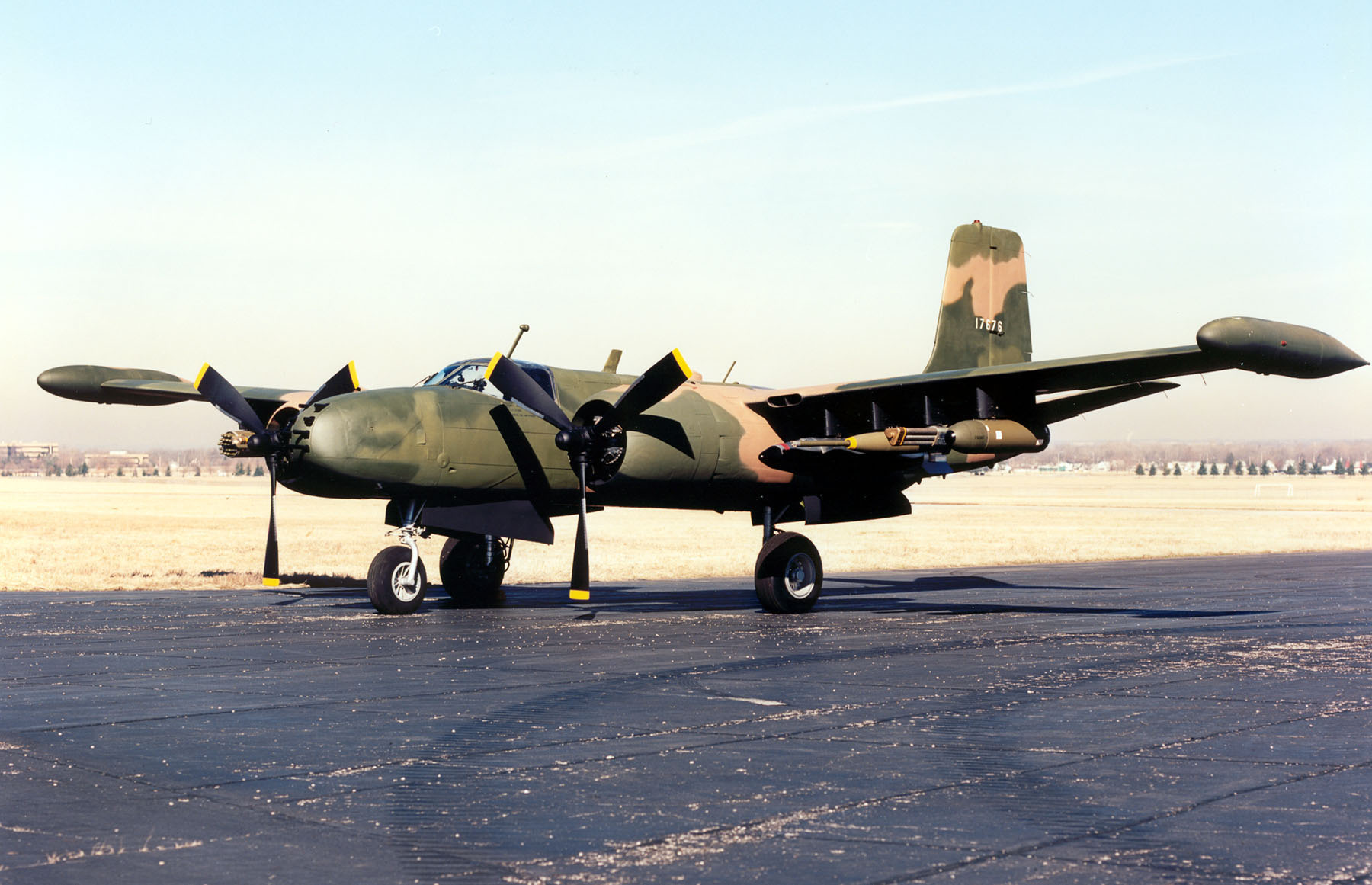
B-26K/A-26A Counter Invader (64-17675)

=== South Vietnam ===
Republic of Vietnam Air Force

B-26 aircraft operated in Vietnamese markings were actually part of the US Air Force and crewed by Americans.

=== Turkey ===
Turkish Air Force

=== United Kingdom ===
Royal Air Force
Three A-26s were evaluated by the Aeroplane and Armament Experimental Establishment in 1944–45. While it was planned for Britain to acquire 140 Invaders under Lend-Lease, these plans were abandoned in April 1945, owing to the imminent end to the war in Europe.

=== United States ===
United States Army Air Forces
United States Air Force
United States Navy

== Civilian operators ==
After military service, many B-26 aircraft were converted for use as "executive" personnel transports. From the late 1950s to the early 1970s, a similar number of B-26s were converted for use as "airtankers" and used to fight forest fires in the United States and subsequently in Canada into the late 1990s.

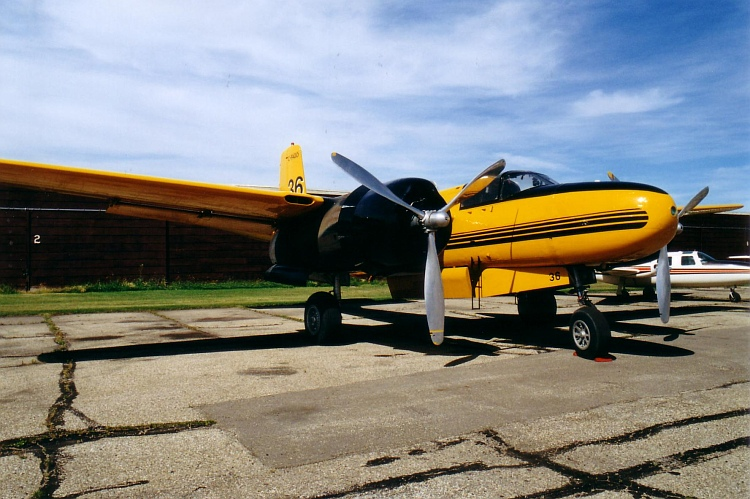
B-26 airtanker C-FAGO operated by Air Spray (1967) Ltd, at Red Deer, Alberta, 2000

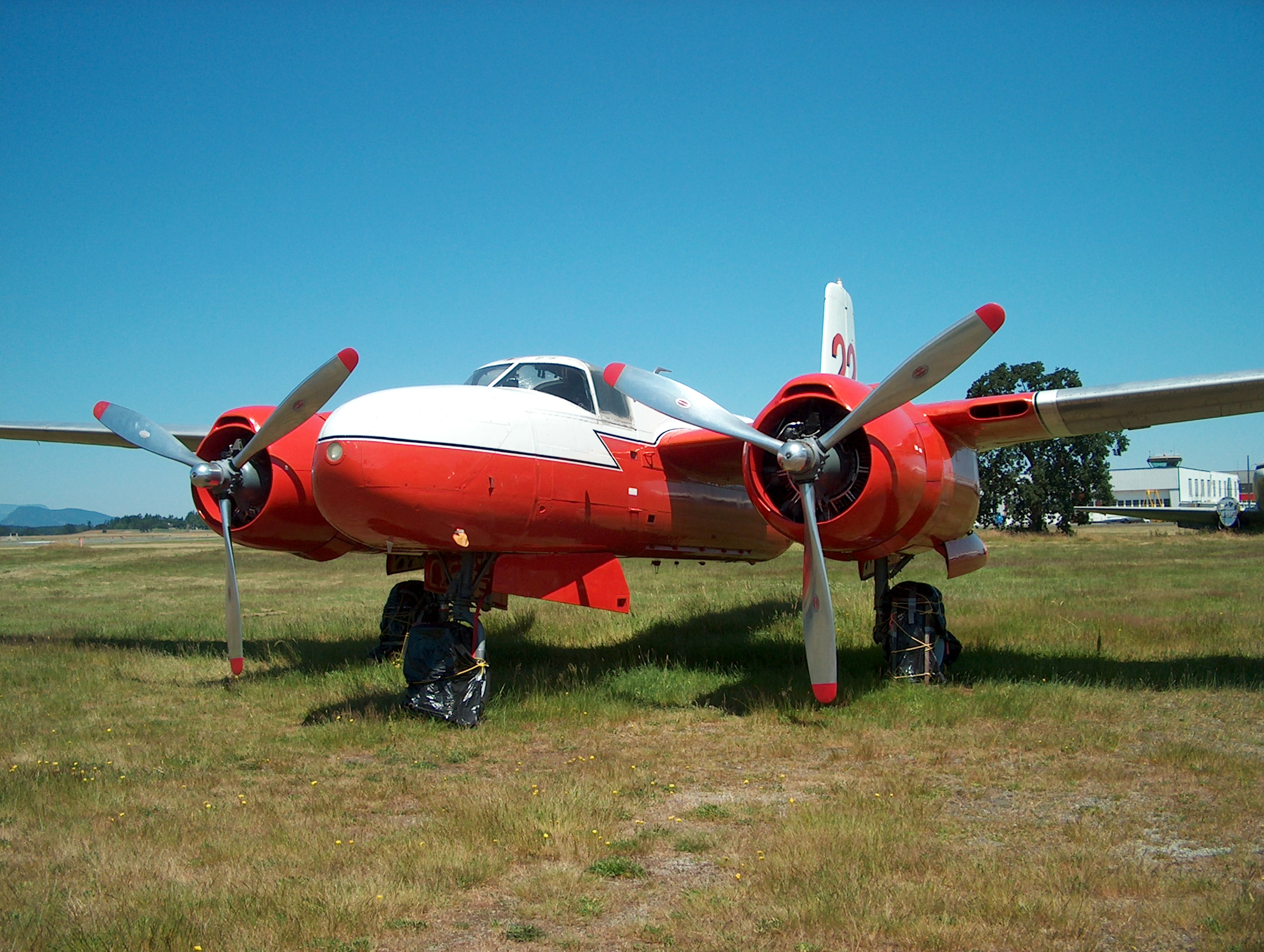
B-26 airtanker CF-BMS Conair fleet no. 322, at the British Columbia Aviation Museum, Sidney, Canada

=== Canada ===
- Air Spray, Red Deer, Alberta, Canada
- Conair Group Inc., Abbotsford, British Columbia, Canada
- Kenting Aviation Ltd, Toronto, Ontario, Canada

=== United States ===
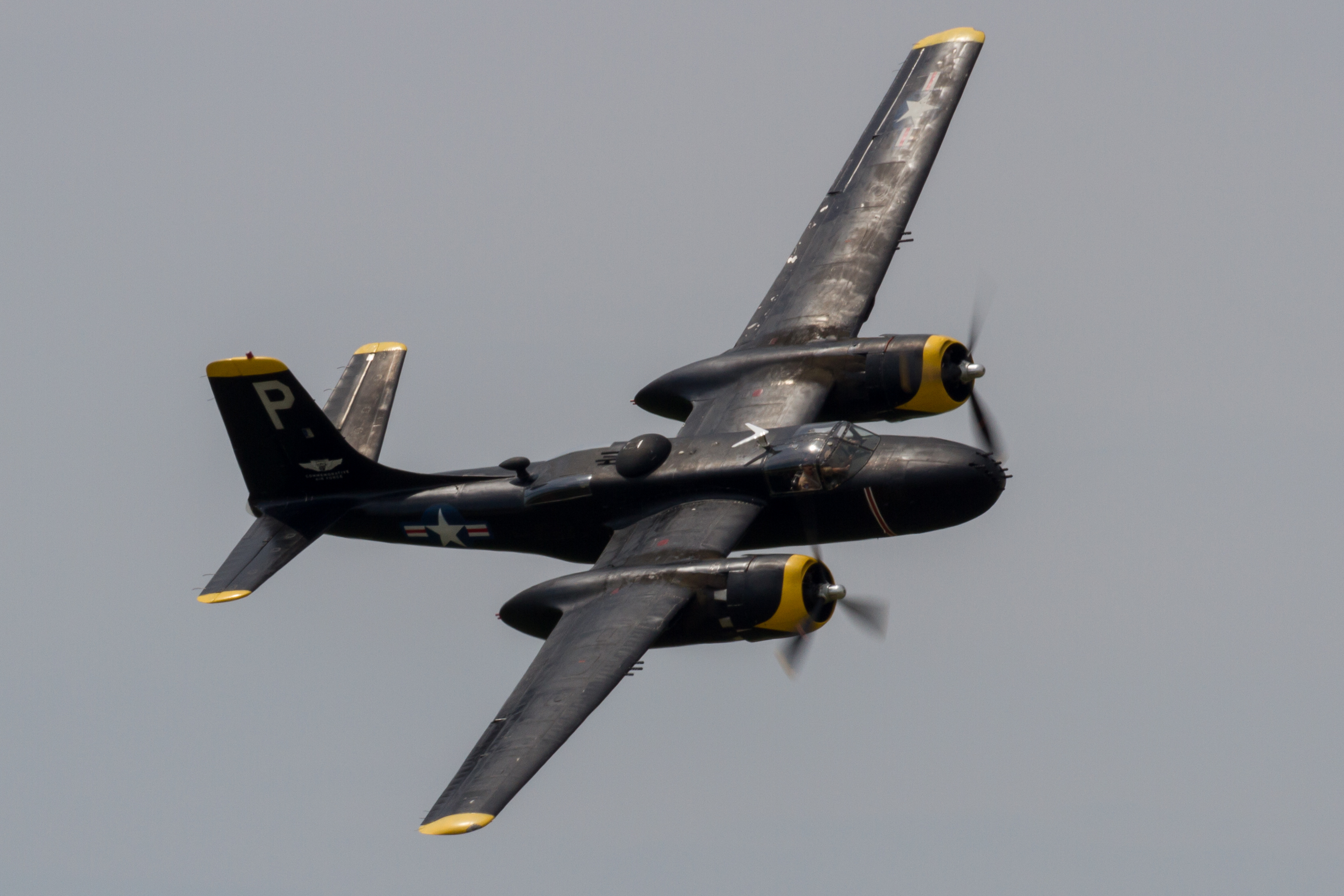
A-26B "Night Mission" from the Commemorative Air Force performing in 2016.

- Aeroflight Inc, Troutdale, Oregon
- Aero Union Corp, Chico, California
- Air America, Washington DC
- Aircraft Specialties, Mesa, Arizona
- Bell Helicopter, Fort Worth, Texas
- Butler Aircraft Co, (Calvin J Butler), Redmond, Oregon
- Calspan Flight Research, Buffalo, New York
- Central Air Service, Rantoul, Kansas and East Wenatchee, Washington state
- Commemorative Air Force, Midland, TX
- Cornell Aero Lab, Buffalo, New York
- William A Dempsay (dba Central Air Service), Rantoul, Kansas
- Donaire Inc, Deer Valley, Arizona
- Flight Enterprises, Prescott, Arizona
- Garrett AiResearch, Phoenix, Arizona
- Gulf Air Inc (CIA), Miami, Florida
- Hillcrest Aviation, La Grande, Oregon
- Hughes Aircraft, Culver City, California
- Idaho Air Tankers Inc, Boise, Idaho
- Johnson Flying Service, Missoula, Montana
- RG LeTourneau Inc, Longview, Texas
- Lynch Air Tankers (Lynch Flying Service), Billings, Montana
- Nine Ten Corp, Chicago, Illinois
- Occidental Leasing (Occidental Oil), Los Angeles, California
- Pan American Petroleum Corp, Tulsa, Oklahoma
- PFB Enterprises ?
- Phillips Petroleum Company, Oklahoma
- Reeder Flying Service, Twin Falls, Idaho
- Rock Island Oil and Refining Co, Hutchinson, Kansas
- Rosenbalm Aviation Inc, Medford, Oregon
- Stahmann Farms Inc, Las Cruces, New Mexico
- Standard Oil of Illinois, Chicago, Illinois
- Standard Oil of California
- Stanolind Oil & Gas Co, Tulsa, Oklahoma
- INVADER LEASING LLC, Kingsford, Michigan

=== Norway ===
- Widerøe's Flyveselskap A/S, Oslo, Norway

== See also ==
- A-26 Invader
- A-26 Invader survivors
