= List of surviving Douglas A-26 Invaders =

The A-26 Invader (B-26 between 1948–1965) was a twin-engined light attack bomber, built by the Douglas Aircraft Co. during World War II, that also saw service during several other conflicts in the post-war era of the latter 20th century.

== Surviving aircraft ==
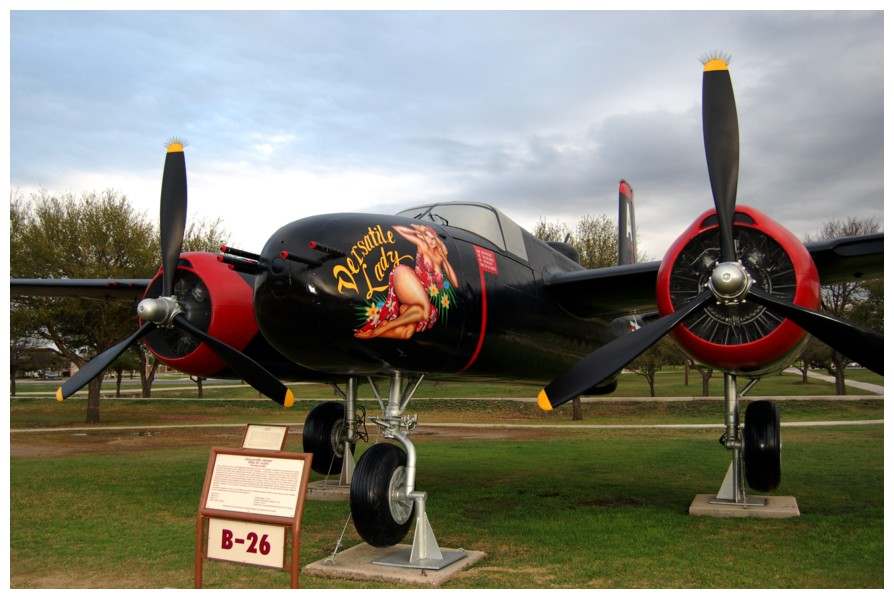
A-26C, AF Ser. No. 44-35918, with nose art from A-26B, AF Ser. No. 44-34287, "Versatile Lady" USAF Airman Heritage Museum, Lackland AFB

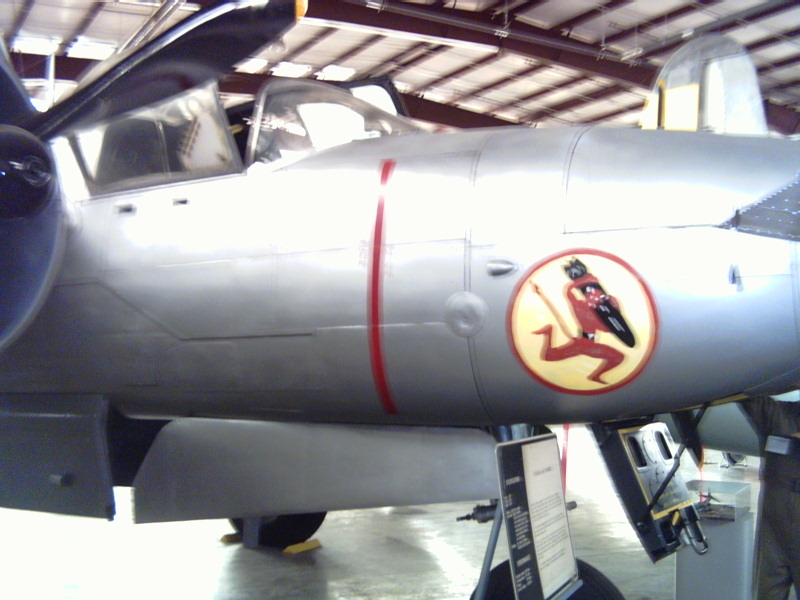
A-26C, AF Ser. No. 44-35892, at Pueblo Weisbrod Aircraft Museum

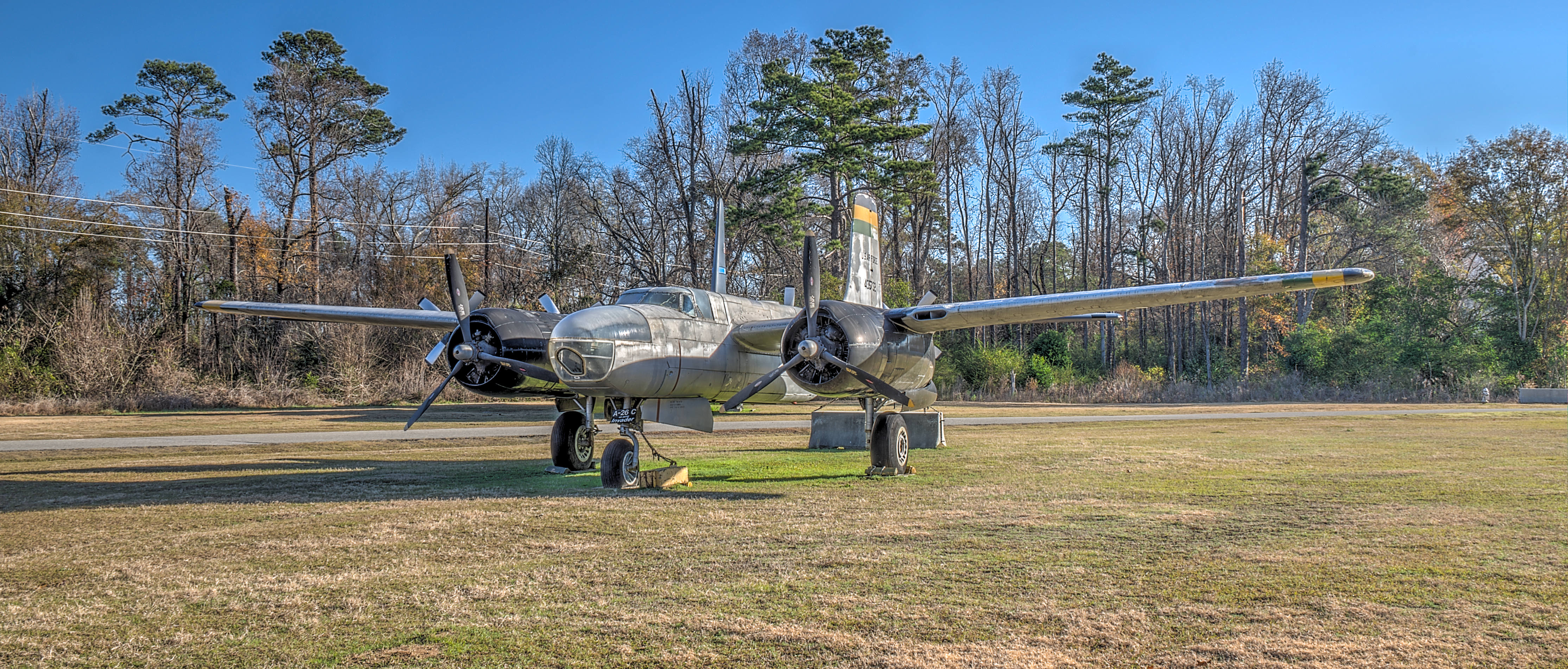
A-26C formerly at the Museum of Aviation, Robins AFB

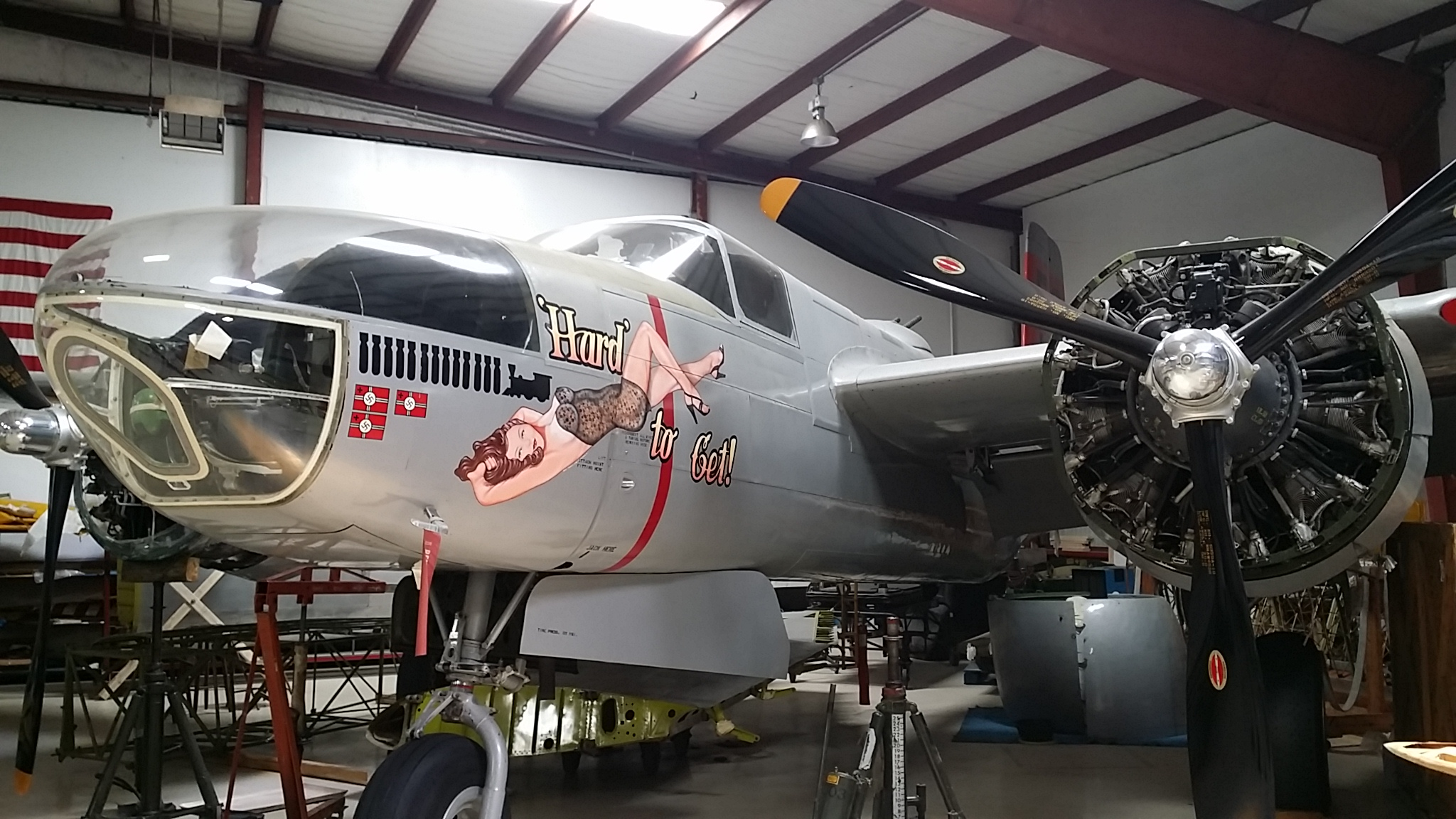
A-26C at the Cavanaugh Flight Museum

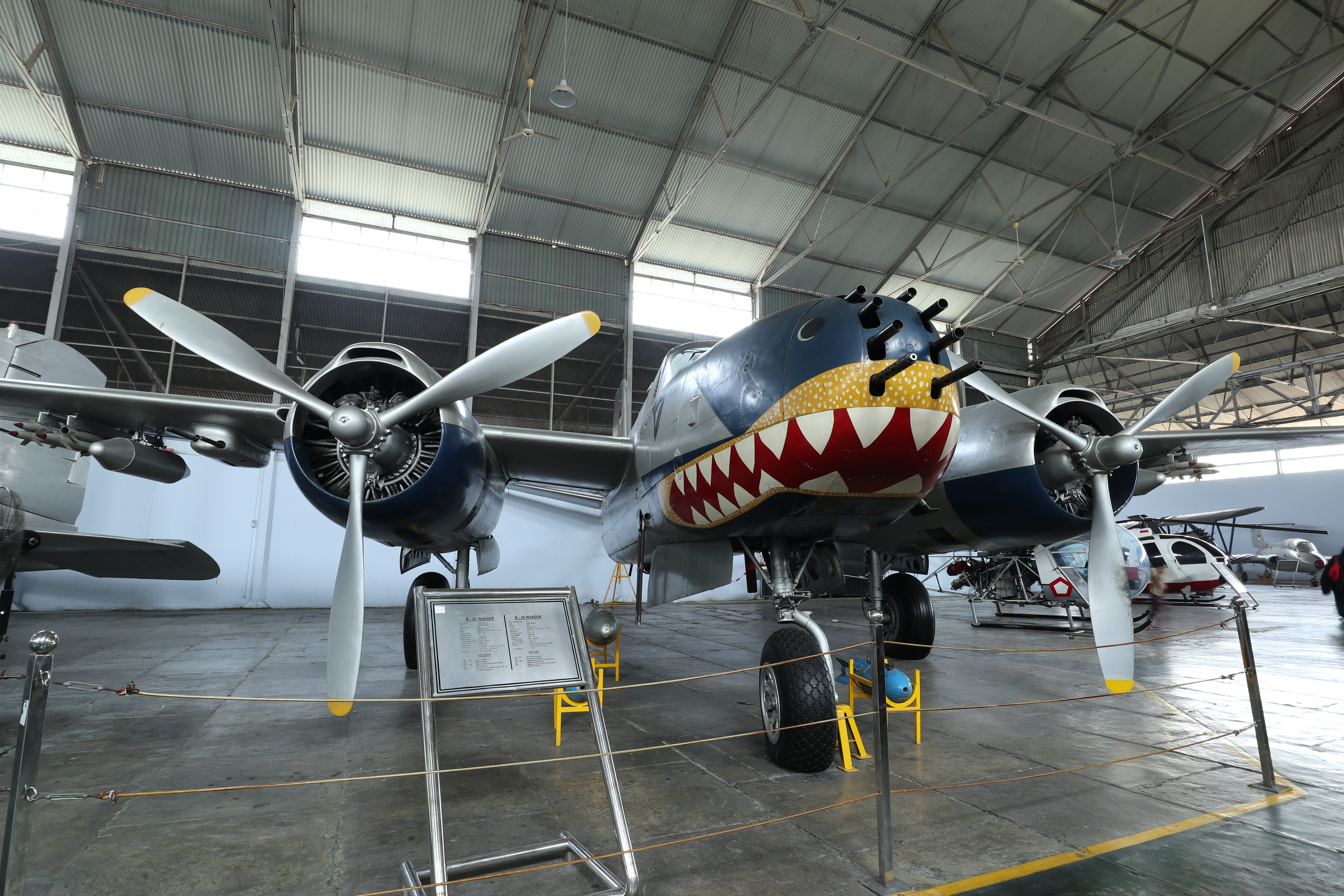
Indonesian Air Force A-26B at the Dirgantara Mandala Museum

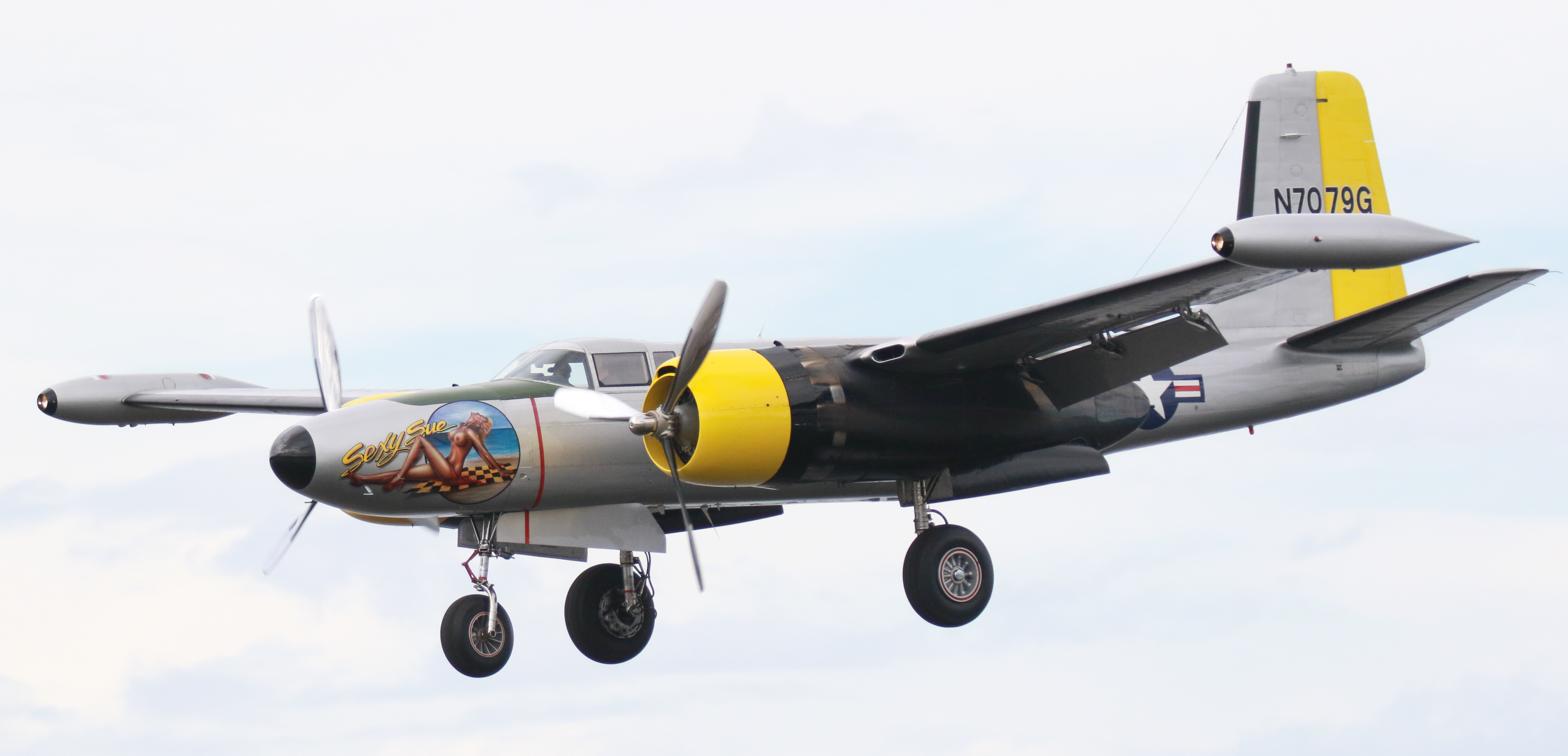
A-26C "Sexy Sue" in 2020

These complete examples of the A-26 Invader have been preserved or restored, and are on display at museums or at military bases, or are active aircraft potentially viewable at air events.

Status Codes:

D = Display
A = Airworthy
S = Stored
R = Under restoration

Designation	USAAF Serial	Displayed Identity	Status	Current location
A-26B	41-39161	436874	R	Military Aviation Museum, Virginia Beach, Virginia. N26RP
A-26B (JD-1)	41-39215	446928	D	National Naval Aviation Museum, NAS Pensacola, Florida
A-26B	41-39221	N26GT	S	South Mountain High School, Phoenix, Arizona. (On Mark Marksman)
A-26B	41-39223	-	S	Ailes Anciennes Toulouse, Toulouse, France
A-26B "A-26C"	41-39230	139230	D	Previously Commemorative Air Force, Enid, Oklahoma. N9682C, Named "Lady Liberty"; after accident in 2025, added in 2026 as a static display to the Tulsa Air and Space Museum & Planetarium.
A-26B	41-39288	5159 (FAB)	D	Museu Aeroespacial, Campo dos Afonsos, Rio de Janeiro, Brazil (image)
A-26B	41-39303	434324	D	Pacific Coast Air Museum, Santa Rosa, California. Named "City Of Santa Rosa" (images)
A-26C	41-39327	863 (FACh)	D	Cerro Moreno AB, Antofagasta, Chile
A-26B "A-26C"	41-39359	39359	A	Million Air (Tailwinds LLC), Houston, Texas. N26BP, named "Million Airess"
A-26B "A-26C"	41-39401	-	R	Fantasy of Flight, Polk City, Florida. N39401 Currently under restoration at Aero Trader in Chino, California
A-26B	41-39427	437140	A	Commemorative Air Force, Meacham Field, Texas. N240P, named "Night Mission"
A-26B	41-39472	435648	D	Castle Air Museum, Castle Airport (former Castle AFB), Atwater, California. (image)
A-26B	41-39516	0-139516	D	Wings of Eagles Discovery Center, Horseheads, Elmira, New York
A-26B	41-39537	840 (FACh)	D	Museo Nacional Aeronáutico y del Espacio, Cerrillos, Chile (image)
A-26B "A-26C"	43-22258	434220	D	Grand Forks AFB, Grand Forks, North Dakota (image)
A-26B	43-22357	CF-BMS	D	British Columbia Aviation Museum, Sidney, British Columbia, Canada. (Civil air tanker configuration) (image)
A-26B	43-22444	434156	D	Vance AFB, Enid, Oklahoma
A-26B "A-26C"	43-22494	322494	D	Pima Air & Space Museum, Tucson, Arizona (image)
A-26C "A-26B"	43-22499	322499	D	New England Air Museum, Windsor Locks, Connecticut. Named "Reida Rae"
A-26C	43-22602	-	R	MAPS Air Museum, Canton, Ohio.
A-26C "B-26K"	43-22652	43652	D	Jimmy Doolittle Air & Space Museum, Travis AFB, Fairfield, California
A-26C	43-22653	(C-GPTW)	S	Bankstown Airport, Sydney, Australia
A-26C "A-26B"	43-22679	612	D	Royal Saudi Air Force Museum, Riyadh, Saudi Arabia
A-26B	44-34104	N99420	A	1941 Historical Aircraft Group Museum, Geneseo, New York. Named "Silver Dragon", Currently at Ford Airport KIMT
A-26B	44-34134	5176 (FAB)	D?	Museu de Armas e Veículos e Avioes Motorizados Antigos, Bebedouro, São Paulo, Brazil
A-26B	44-34165	-	S	Air Force Flight Test Center Museum, Edwards AFB, California
A-26B	44-34172	-	R	Ailes Anciennes de Corbas, Corbas, France.
A-26B "A-26C"	44-34313	434313	A	Marcin Kubrak, Katowice, Poland. NL4313, Named "Sweet Eloise II"
A-26B "A-26C"	44-34423	434423	S	Armed Forces and Aerospace Museum, Spokane Valley, Washington
A-26B	44-34508	-	R	W.S. Glover, Mount Pleasant, Texas. N74874
A-26B	44-34520	434520	A	Lauridsen Aviation Museum, Buckeye, Arizona. N126HP, Named "Lu Lu" (images)
A-26B	44-34535	937	S	Museo del Aire, San Antonio de los Baños Air Base, Cuba
A-26B "A-26C"	44-34538	434538	DA	Lyon Air Museum, Santa Ana, California. N34538, Named "Feeding Frenzy"
A-26B	44-34559	0-34559	D	Mississippi Air National Guard - 172nd Airlift Wing, Jackson ANGB, Jackson, Mississippi
B-26B (A-26B)	44-34568	-	D	Pakistan Air Force Museum, Karachi, Sindh, Pakistan
A-26B	44-34602	434602	A	Tina Fly GmbH, Bremgarten, Germany. N167B, named "Sugarland Express". (images)
A-26B	44-34610	-	S	National Air and Space Museum, Chantilly, Virginia
A-26B	44-34665	434665	D	Strategic Air and Space Museum, Ashland, Nebraska (images)
A-26B	44-34722	4434722	DA	Jack Erickson / Erickson Aircraft Collection, Madras, Oregon. N3222T (images)
A-26B	44-34741	848 (FACh)	D	Plaza de la Cultura Pablo Neruda, Mejillones, Chile
A-26B	44-34746	-	D	VFW (Veterans of Foreign Wars) Post 382, El Reno, Oklahoma. Named "Sonny"
A-26B "A-26C"	44-34749	434749	A	Abrams Airborne Manufacturing Inc, Avra Valley, Arizona. N4959K, Named "Puss & Boots"
A-26B	44-34759	-	D	Iranian Aerospace Exhibition Centre, Mehrabad, Iran
A-26B	44-34765	434765	D	Musée Royal de l'Armée, Brussels, Belgium. Named "Mission Completed" (images)
A-26B	44-34766	N26BK	A	H.B. Keck / Thermco Aviation, Thermal, California
A-26B	44-34769	N500MR	A	Comanche Warbirds Inc, Bern, Switzerland. N500MR, named "Rum and Coke"
A-26B "A-26C"	44-34773	435740	D	Musée de l'Air et de l'Espace, Le Bourget, Paris, France
A-26B	44-34778	RCAF 098	A	Air Ross (1980) Inc, Calgary, Alberta, Canada. Based in St. Andrews, Manitoba. C-GWLT
A-26C	44-35204	435204	D	Laughlin AFB, Del Rio, Texas
A-26C	44-35224	435224	D	March Field Air Museum, March ARB, Riverside, California. Named "Midnight Endeavour"
A-26C	44-35323	435323	DA	Planes of Fame Grand Canyon, Valle, Arizona. N8026E, Named "Ahaulin" (image)
A-26C	44-35326	435326	D	Indiana Military Museum, Vincennes, Indiana.
A-26C	44-35371	435371	S	Marine Aviation Museum, Houston, Texas. N4818E
A-26C "A-26B"	44-35439	435439	DA	Evergreen Aviation Museum, McMinnville, Oregon N74833, Named "Margie". (images)
A-26C "A-26B"	44-35440	931	D	Wings Over Miami, Kendall-Tamiami Executive Airport, Miami, Florida (image)
A-26C	44-35444	844	D	Republic of China Air Force Museum, Kaohsiung, Taiwan.
A-26C "A-26B"	44-35456	N5625S	A	Wade Eagleton, Shafter, California. N5625S
A-26C	44-35493	N576JB	D	War Eagles Air Museum, Santa Teresa, New Mexico
A-26C	44-35504	-	D	Châteaudun Air Base, France
A-26C	44-35508	2504 (FAC)	D	Apiay AFB, Villavicencio, Colombia
A-26C "A-26B"	44-35523	435523	R	Air Mobility Command Museum, Dover AFB, Dover, Delaware
A-26C	44-35524	CF-CUI	SA	Reynolds-Alberta Museum, Wetaskiwin, Alberta, Canada (Civil air tanker configuration)
A-26C "A-26B"	44-35562	NL7079G	A	Alien Invaders Inc, Medina, Washington. Named "Sexy Sue"
A-26C "A-26B"	44-35586	5156 (FAB)	D	Augusto Severo AB, Natal, Brazil
A-26C	44-35596	0-435596	D	Hickam Air Force Base, Hawaii
A-26C	44-35601	435601	DS	Commemorative Air Force, Mesa, Arizona. N202R, Named "Miss Murphy"
A-26C "A-26B"	44-35617	435617	D	Hill Aerospace Museum, Hill AFB, Ogden, Utah. Named "Grim Reaper"
A-26C "A-26B"	44-35620	404 (FAG)	D	Technical School, La Aurora, Guatemala
A-26C "A-26B"	44-35627	435627	D	Dodge City Airport, Dodge City, Kansas
A-26C	44-35643	-	RA	Commemorative Air Force, Ada, Oklahoma. N626SH, Named "Lil Twister"
A-26C	44-35696	4-35696	DR	Collings Foundation / Aviation Museum of Texas, Uvalde, Texas. N8036E, Named "My Mary Lou"
A-26C "A-26B"	44-35708	435708	A	Classic Aircraft Aviation Museum, Hillsboro, Oregon. N26PJ (image)
A-26C	44-35710	435710	SA	Cavanaugh Flight Museum, Addison, Texas. N7705C, Named "Hard To Get" (images) Removed from public display when the museum indefinitely closed on 1 January 2024. To be moved to North Texas Regional Airport in Denison, Texas.
A-26C "JD-1"	44-35721	435721	D	Palm Springs Air Museum, Palm Springs, California. N9425Z, Named "Invader" (images)
A-26C	44-35724	434517	D	Southern Museum of Flight, Birmingham, Alabama. Named "Monie"
VB-26	?	?	R	Museum of Aviation, Robins AFB, Warner Robins, Georgia
A-26C	44-35733	435733	D	National Museum USAF, Wright-Patterson AFB, Dayton, Ohio. Named "Dream Girl" (images)
A-26C "A-26B"	44-35752	435752	DR	Carolinas Aviation Museum, Charlotte, North Carolina. Named "Rude Invader".
A-26C	44-35778	2519 (FAC)	D	Museo Aeroespacial Colombiana, Eldorado Air Base, Bogotá, Colombia. (image)
A-26C	44-35788	N126HK	A	Stockton Field Aviation Museum, Stockton, California
A-26C	44-35859	-	D	Conservatoire de l'Air et de l'Espace d'Aquitaine, Bordeaux-Merignac Air Base, France
A-26C "A-26B"	44-35892	4435892	D	Pueblo Weisbrod Aircraft Museum, Pueblo, Colorado
A-26C "A-26B"	44-35898	VH-VNI	A	R.W. McFarlane / Aviation Investments Pty, Archerfield, Brisbane, Australia
A-26C "A-26B"	44-35911	435911	A	George W Lancaster, Wilmington, North Carolina. N6840D, Named "Spirit of NC"
A-26C "A-26B"	44-35913	4435913	D	Dyess Linear Air Park, Dyess AFB, Abilene, Texas. Named "Chadwick" on left side, with "Oscar" the grim reaper on the right side nose art. Repainted summer of 2021.< Historian, 7th BW, Dyess AFB, TX>
A-26C "A-26B"	44-35918	434287	D	USAF Airman Heritage Museum, Lackland AFB, San Antonio, Texas. Named "Versatile Lady" (images)
A-26C	44-35937	435937	D	Jackson Barracks Military Museum, New Orleans, Louisiana
A-26C "A-26B"	44-35948	N381EC	D	Champaign Aviation Museum, Grimes Field, Urbana, Ohio. N381EC
A-26C	44-35986	435884	D	Selfridge Military Air Museum, Selfridge Air National Guard Base, Detroit, Michigan. Named "Stormy Weather"
B-26K (A-26A)	64-17640	17640	D	South Dakota Air and Space Museum, Ellsworth AFB, Rapid City, South Dakota
B-26K (A-26A)	64-17651	64651	D	KAI Aerospace Museum, Sachon, South Korea (image)
B-26K (A-26A)	64-17653	64653	D	Pima Air & Space Museum, Tucson, Arizona (images)
B-26K (A-26A)	64-17666	64666	D	Air Commando Park, Hurlburt Field, Florida (image)
B-26K (A-26A)	64-17676	64676	D	National Museum of the United States Air Force, Wright-Patterson AFB, Dayton, Ohio (images)
B-26K (A-26A)	64-17679	N4988N	A	J.S Reynolds, PGM Aviation, Vintage Flying Museum, Fort Worth, Texas. Named "Special Kay" and only airworthy K variant
A-26C	unknown	227 (FAP)	D	Las Palmas AB, Lima, Peru
A-26C	unknown	226 (FAP)	D	Pisco AB, Peru
A-26B	unknown	601 (FAS)	D	Museo Nacional de Aviación, Ilopango AB, El Salvador (image)
A-26B	unknown	M-264 (AURI)	D	Abdul Rachman Saleh AFB, Malang, East Java, Indonesia
A-26B	unknown	M-265 (AURI)	D	Dirgantara Mandala Museum, Adisucipto AFB, Yogyakarta, Special Region of Yogyakarta, Indonesia
A-26B	unknown	M-265 (AURI)	D	Taman Prestasi Surabaya, Surabaya, East Java, Indonesia
