= Martin 193 =

1940s US giant cargo transport seaplane design

General information
- Type: Flying boat
- National origin: United States
- Manufacturer: Glenn L. Martin Company
- Status: Cancelled
- Primary user: United States Navy (intended)

The Martin 193 was a design for a giant cargo transport seaplane that was conceived in 1942 as part of the "Sky Freighter" concept for colossal flying boats that could carry large loads of troops and freight across the Atlantic Ocean in response to the sinking of Allied merchant ships by U-boats.

It was basically a 40% enlargement of the Martin JRM Mars, weighing 250,000 pounds (110,000 kg) at takeoff and featuring a longer hull and wingspan, being powered by six radial piston engines. No powerplant types were revealed.

The Martin 193 lost out to the Hughes H-4 Hercules, and after the end of World War II obviated the urgency for Sky Freighters. Martin considered a civilian version of the Model 193, but the airlines were uninterested.

== See also ==
Related development

- Martin JRM Mars

Aircraft of comparable role, configuration, and era

- Hughes H-4 Hercules

Related lists

- List of aircraft of World War II
- List of flying boats and floatplanes
