= Martin JRM Mars =

Large, four-engined cargo transport flying boat

JRM Mars
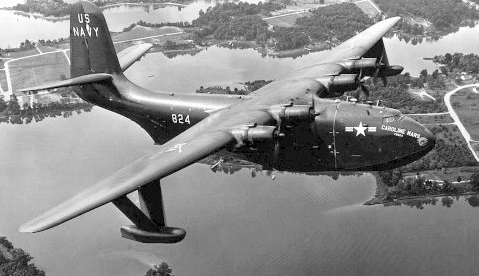
- JRM-2 Mars "Caroline Mars" in US Navy service

General information
- Type: Flying boat
- National origin: United States
- Manufacturer: Glenn L. Martin Company
- Status: Retired
- Primary users: United States Navy (historical): Forest Industries Flying Tankers (FIFT) (historical); Coulson Aviation (historical)
- Number built: 7

History
- Manufactured: 1945–1948
- Introduction date: 30 November 1943
- First flight: 23 June 1942
- Retired: 1956 (USN) 2024 (Civilian)
- Developed into: Martin 193

The Martin JRM Mars is a retired large, four-engined cargo transport flying boat designed and built by the Martin Company for the United States Navy (US Navy). It was the largest Allied flying boat to enter production during World War II, although only seven were completed.

The Mars was developed during the late 1930s and early 1940s as a scaled up derivative of the PBM Mariner patrol bomber, internally designated Model 170. Under contract from the US Navy, an initial prototype, the XPB2M-1 Mars, performed its maiden flight on 23 June 1942. While originally intended to be adopted as a long-range ocean patrol flying boat, as the conflict progressed, the Mars was reoriented towards the long-range transport mission, thus redesignated XPB2M-1R. The flying boat commenced ferrying cargo to Hawaii and the Pacific Islands on 23 January 1944. While a batch of 20 Mars was at one point on order for the US Navy, the service opted to curtail the order to seven aircraft following the end of end of World War II. An envisioned civil airliner variant, Model 170-24A, was never put into production.

Up until 1956, the US Navy typically used the type on San Francisco-Honolulu route, after which it was withdrawn from service and stored. Thereafter, four of the surviving Mars were converted for civilian use as firefighting water bombers. Two of the aircraft were based at Sproat Lake, just outside of Port Alberni, British Columbia, Canada, one of which, Hawaii Mars, remained in operation until 2016, after which it was preserved at the British Columbia Aviation Museum. The Philippine Mars is also to be permanently displayed at the Pima Air & Space Museum in Tucson, Arizona. No remaining examples are operational.

== Design and development ==
During the late 1930s, the Glenn L. Martin Company was engaged in the production of the PBM Mariner patrol bomber for the United States Navy (US Navy). From an early stage of the Mariner's development, the company's design staff had started work on the Model 170, a considerably larger four-engined derivative. In August 1938, following a presentation of the Model 170 to the Bureau of Aeronautics, the US Navy placed an order for one prototype, designated XPB2M-1 Mars. Due to other work commitments, the company was unable to start construction of this prototype until mid-1940. In early November 1941, the XPB2M-1 was ready to conduct taxiing tests; at the time, it was the largest flying boat as well as the third largest aircraft of any type then in existence in the world.

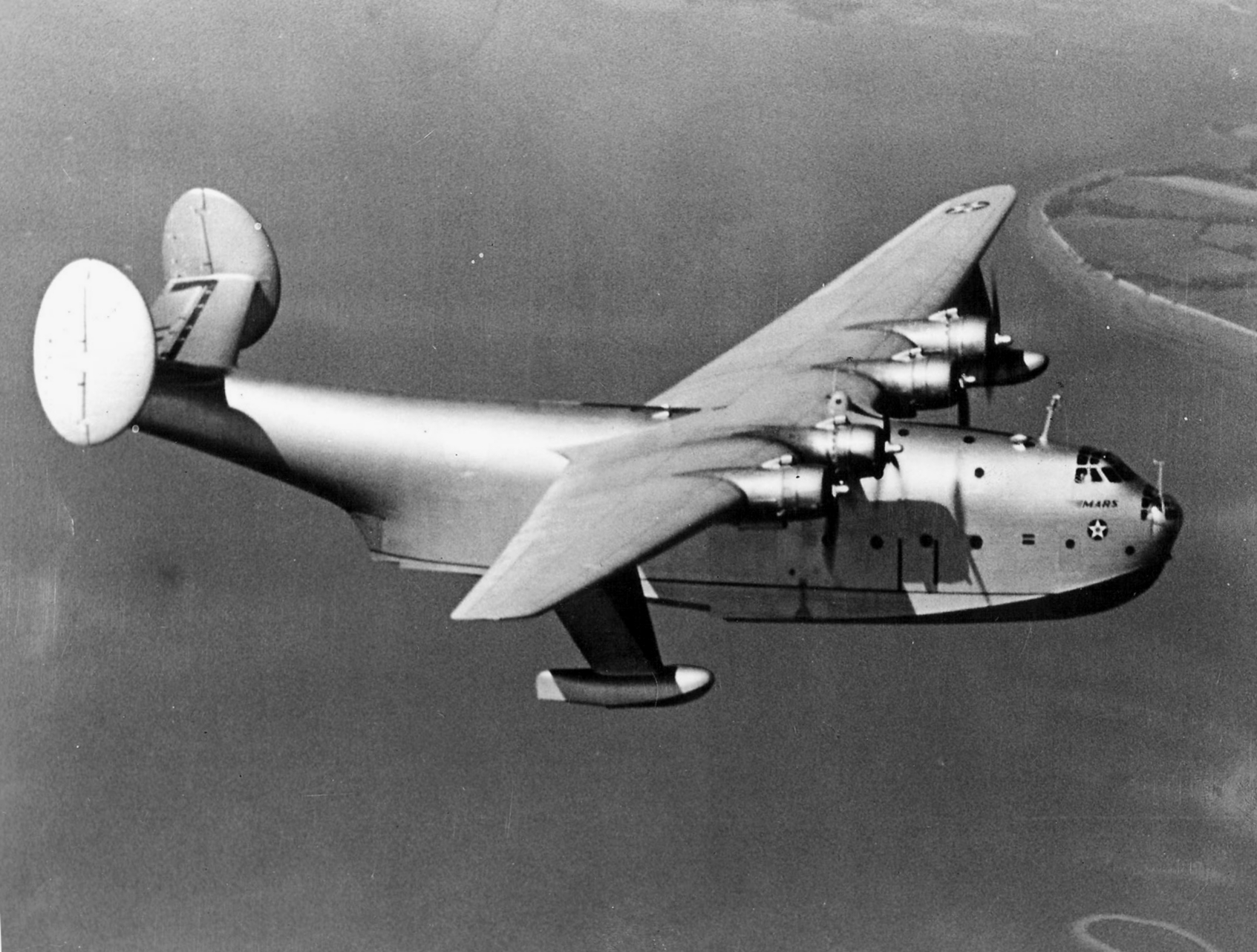
The prototype XPB2M-1 Mars, 1942

The XPB2M-1 shared its general hull configuration and its twin-fin arrangement with the preceding Mariner. It was powered by four Wright R-3350 Duplex-Cyclone 18-cylinder radial engines, each one rated to produce 2,200 hp. The type's envisioned armament arrangement consisted of two bomb bays, one under each wing, that could accommodate up to five 1,000-pound bombs, while a total of five turrets, each armed with a single .30-caliber machine gun, were present for self-defense.

The flight controls of the Mars have been described as being strenuous to operate, the rudder being one of the few controls to be boosted. Accordingly, the pilot and flight engineer had to cooperate closely when operating the flying boat both in flight and while upon the water. Flights, which were limited to day time, typically required considerable attention to trimming. To provide greater control to manoeuvre while alighting, reversible propellers were fitted to two of the engines; this function was guarded by a safety switch under the control of the flight engineer. While landing, full flaps were typically deployed. Engine run-ups while aligning were performed with considerable attention being paid to keeping the nose of the flying boat up. The external inspections performed both pre-flight and post-flight were performed using a boat.

Ground testing was protracted on account of an engine fire that inflicted substantial damage to the prototype's starboard wing, necessitating six months of repair work. the XPB2M-1 conducted its maiden flight on 23 June 1942. While the flight test programme proceeded, wider events impacted the programme. By this time, the original patrol bomber concept the flying boat was intended to fulfil was considered obsolete, US Navy planners having redirected their focus for combat aircraft being based onboard their aircraft carriers instead. Instead, it was decided that the aircraft could be used to address the ongoing threat posed to Atlantic shipping by the U-boats of Nazi Germany. Accordingly, the Mars was stripped of all armament and bombing apparatus for conversion into a transport aircraft, designated as the XPB2M-1R.

In 1943, the industrialist Henry J. Kaiser offered to license-build the Mars in quantity at multiple shipyards on the West Coast, however, Glenn Martin were uninterested in sharing the production rights with another manufacturer, thus nothing came of this proposal. Factory testing of the transport conversion was completed in mid-1943, after which the XPB2M-1R was delivered to the US Navy for operational evaluation and crew training. In June 1944, having been sufficiently satisfied by the performance of the prototype, the US Navy ordered 20 of the modified JRM-1 Mars. These production aircraft differed somewhat from the earlier prototype, including the use of a single vertical fin, the hull being lengthened by three feet, fewer internal bulkheads, and the adoption of a new cargo-handling system.

The first, named Hawaii Mars, was delivered in late July 1945, but was lost in an accident on the Chesapeake Bay only weeks after its first flight. However, shortly after the end of World War II, the US Navy opted to scale back their order, purchasing only the five aircraft which were then on the production line. Accordingly, the other five Mars were completed, the last of which was delivered in 1947. The company had worked on an airliner version of the Mars, the Model 170-24A, capable of seating up to 79 passengers and to be powered by Pratt & Whitney R-4360 engines, the postwar market for civilian flying boats was relatively meagre, leading to the concept being discontinued.

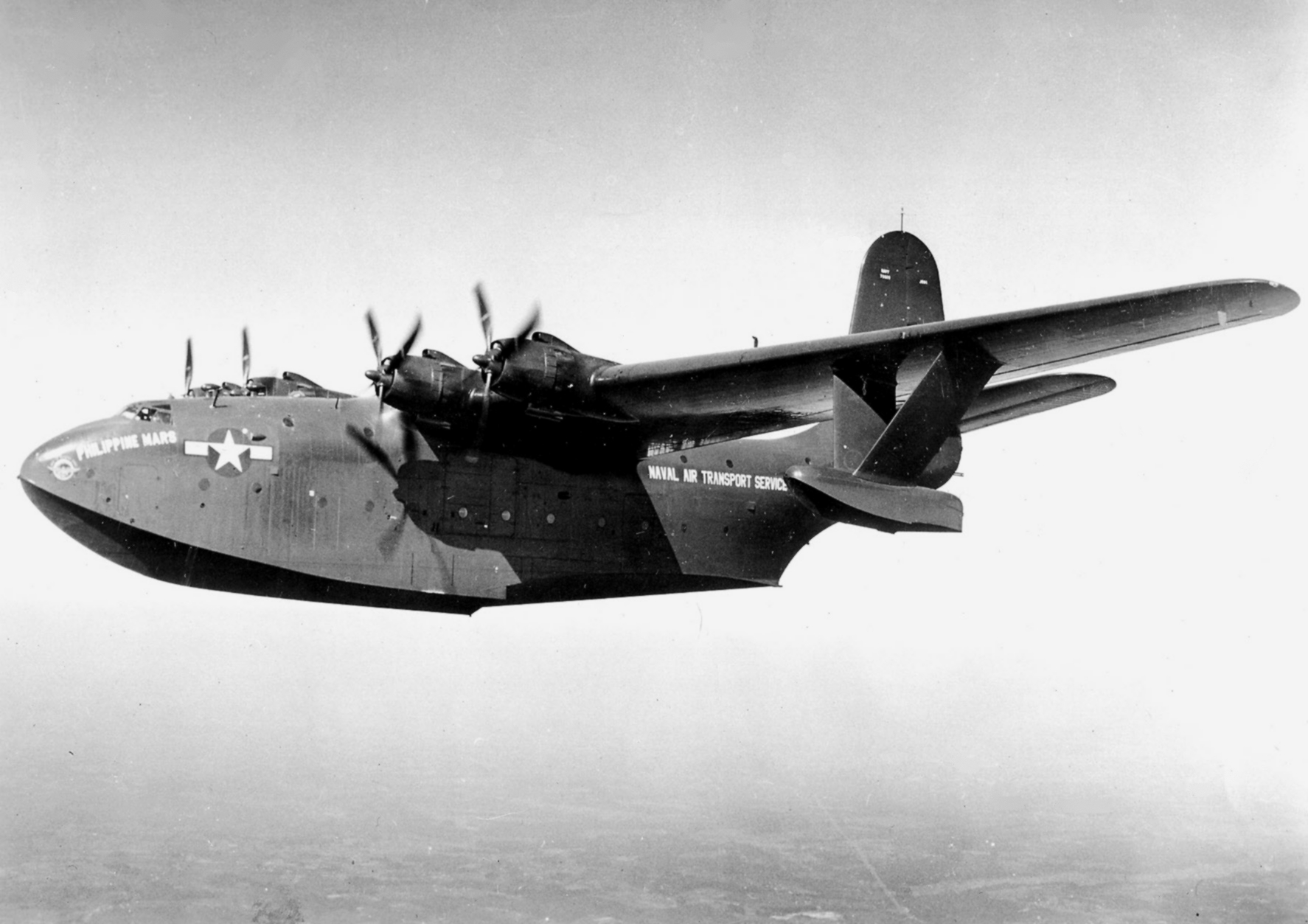
JRM-1 "Philippine Mars" in December 1945

== Operational history ==
=== U.S. Navy service ===
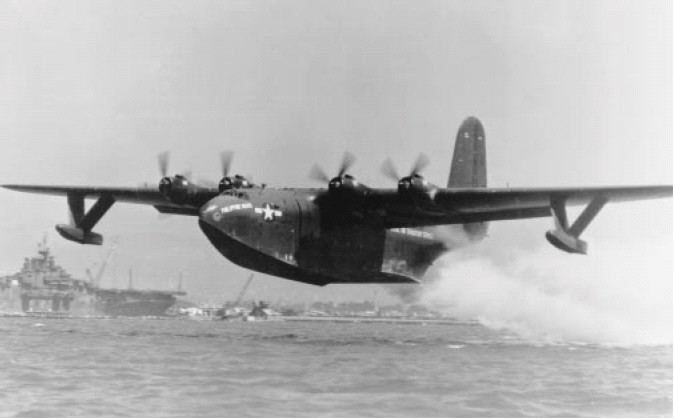
JRM-1 BuNo 76820, Philippine Mars taking off from San Francisco Bay, 1946

Named the Marianas Mars, Philippine Mars, Marshall Mars, Caroline Mars, and a second Hawaii Mars, the five production Mars aircraft entered service ferrying cargo to Hawaii and the Pacific Islands on 23 January 1944. The last production airplane (the Caroline Mars) was designated JRM-2, powered by 3,000 hp (2,200 kW) Pratt & Whitney R-4360 engines, and featured a higher maximum weight and other improvements. On 4 March 1949, the Caroline Mars set a new world passenger load record by carrying 269 people from San Diego to San Francisco, California. On 5 April 1950, the Marshall Mars was lost near Hawaii when an engine fire consumed the airplane after her crew had evacuated. The remaining "Big Four" flew record amounts of U.S. Navy cargo on the San Francisco-Honolulu route efficiently.

However, in 1956, the Us Navy decided to end its use of flying boats for transporting cargo, leading to the final military flight of the type taking place on 22 August 1956. Thereafter, the remaining flying boats were beached at Naval Air Station Alameda for a time.

=== Civilian use ===
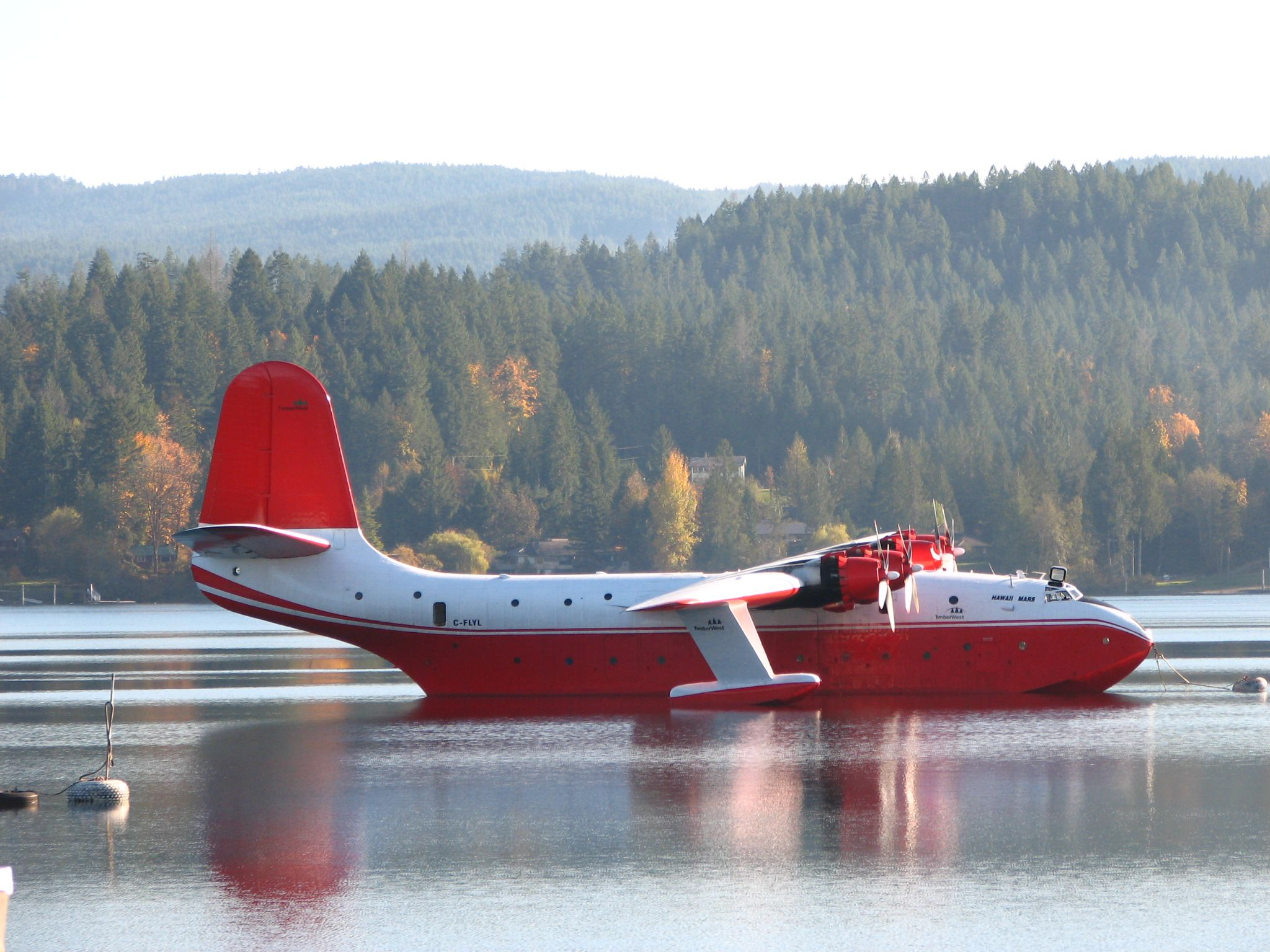
Moored on Sproat Lake, Vancouver Island. October 2006

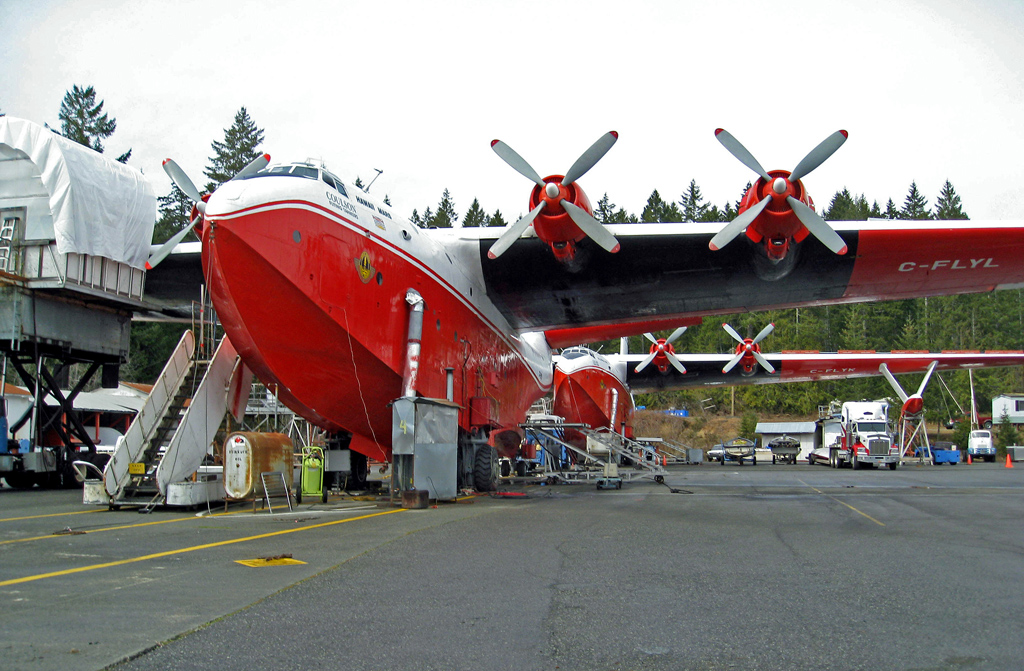
Undergoing winter maintenance in 2008 with Philippine Mars in the background

Martin JRM Mars C-FLYL, Hawaii Mars

In 1959, the remaining four Mars flying boats were to be sold for scrap. However, a Canadian company, Forest Industries Flying Tankers (FIFT), was formed and bid for the Mars as well as the sizable inventory of spares for the type. The company, which represented a consortium of British Columbia forest companies, was successful, the sale being completed in December 1959. The four aircraft were flown to Fairey Aviation at Victoria, British Columbia, for conversion into water bombers. This conversion process involved the installation of a 7,200 US gal (27,000 L; 6,000 imp gal) plywood tank in the cargo bay with retractable pick-up scoops to allow uploading of water while taxiing – 27 tonnes (27 long tons; 30 short tons) could be taken on board in 22 seconds. Other changes included the removal of surplus military apparatus and the installation of overhauled R-3350-24WA engines. Later on, some of the hull fuel tanks were replaced with water tanks.

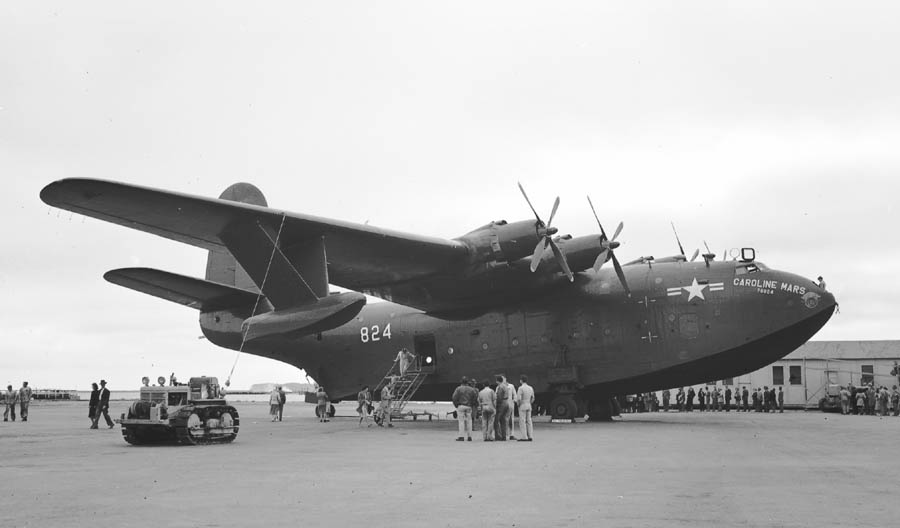
"Caroline Mars" on exhibit at the San Francisco Airport Air Fair on October 10, 1948

The Marianas Mars crashed near Northwest Bay, British Columbia, on 23 June 1961 during firefighting operations; all four crew members died. Just over a year later, on 12 October 1962 while parked onshore at the Victoria airport, the Caroline Mars was damaged beyond repair by Typhoon Freda when it was blown 200 metres (220 yd), breaking its back. The Hawaii Mars and Philippine Mars had their conversion into water bombers advanced and entered service in 1963. They appeared at local airshows, demonstrating their water-dropping ability. Flying Tankers Inc. flew the water bombers to hot spots around the province when a need developed, such as in August 2003, when a large forest fire threatened the outskirts of Kelowna, British Columbia.

On 10 November 2006, TimberWest Forest Ltd. announced they were looking for buyers of the Mars. A condition of sale was that the purchaser would have to donate one plane back to Port Alberni when they were retired, as a historic attraction. The Glenn L. Martin Maryland Aviation Museum and British Columbia Aviation Council initiated a joint effort to preserve the aircraft, one for display in Maryland and the other at the current location in Canada. On 13 April 2007, TimberWest announced the sale of both aircraft to Coulson Forest Products, a local forestry company in Port Alberni, British Columbia. The two surviving tankers were operated by Coulson Flying Tankers from their base at Sproat Lake near Port Alberni until their retirement in 2024. On 25 October 2007, the Hawaii Mars ("Redtail") arrived at Lake Elsinore in southern California, on a private contract, to assist with firefighting efforts at the California wildfires of October 2007. Meanwhile, the Philippine Mars had been undergoing "extensive maintenance and renovation" and was expected to be ready to fly again by 2010. As of 13 August 2009, the Hawaii Mars was in service fighting the La Brea Fire east of Santa Maria in Southern California.

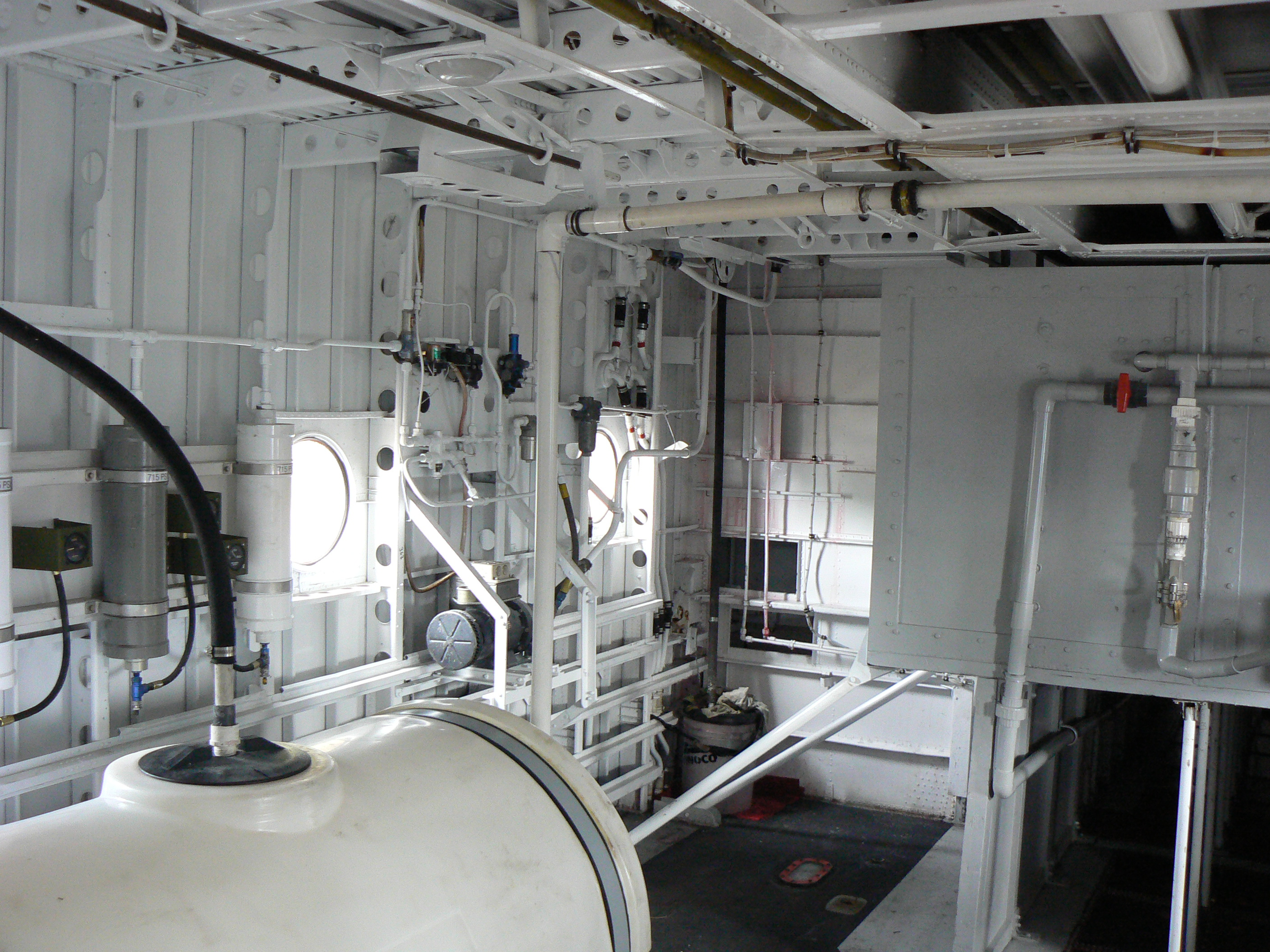
Philippine Mars interior, August 2008. The large tanks hold fire retardant, which is mixed with the water load

The aircraft can carry 7,200 US gal (27,000 L; 6,000 imp gal) of water and each deployment can cover an area of up to 4 acres (1.6 hectares). The aircraft can also carry up to 600 US gal (2,300 L; 500 imp gal) of foam concentrate for gelling the load drop. They had been mainly used to fight fires along the coast of British Columbia and sometimes in the interior. By July 2010, the Martin Mars was being used to fight the Mason Lake/Bonaparte Lake fire north of Kamloops.

On 23 August 2012, the Coulson Group announced that the Philippine Mars, due to its lack of use for five years, would be retired and flown to the National Naval Aviation Museum at Naval Air Station Pensacola, Florida, to become a static exhibit. The aircraft was repainted to its original U.S. Navy colors and was to have been delivered to the museum in November 2012. After many delays, the trade deal of transferring the aircraft to the museum was put on hold by the Navy in June 2016, pending the outcome of the 2016 US Presidential election.

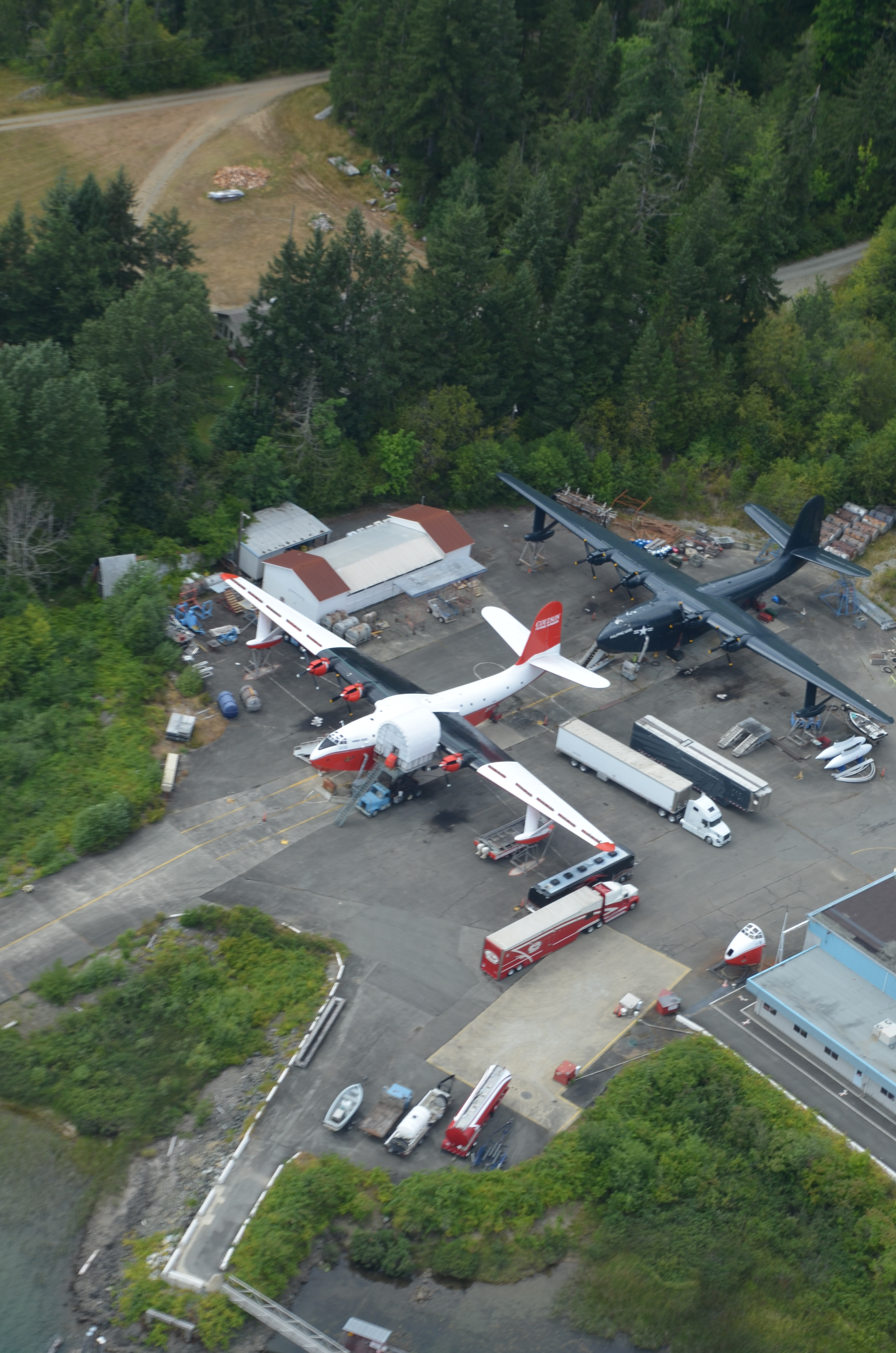
Hawaii Mars (front) and Philippine Mars at Sproat Lake, 2014

On 10 May 2013, the British Columbia provincial government announced that the Hawaii Mars would no longer be placed on contract after the 2013 season, both because it had not been used to fight any local fires for two years and because the Coulson group had begun to operate newer and more versatile aircraft, including a Lockheed C-130 Hercules converted to firefighting use. Although Coulson has stated that the Hawaii Mars has been under numerous recent upgrades to make it safer and more reliable, no buyers have come forward to purchase the aircraft. Coulson also cautioned against any plans to open the aircraft as a tourist attraction, citing declining attendance when the Flying Tankers base was open as a museum before it had to close in 2013.

In May 2015, the Hawaii Mars received a small contract to be used briefly for training Chinese pilots. This was done using the Martin Mars to evaluate against civil certification regulations by the International Test Pilots School on how to handle such a large amphibious aircraft. The pilots would be involved with the Chinese state-owned Aviation Industry Corporation of China as they got ready to launch their forthcoming AVIC AG600 airplane. In July, the training program of 22-hour was completed over six days. In July 2015, the airplane was put back in service, being awarded a 30-day contract from the BC Government to help with a particularly bad fire season.

In 2016, the Hawaii Mars made its first appearance at EAA AirVenture Oshkosh in hopes of being sold or leased to a new home or business. One of the pilots on the way to Oshkosh was well-known Kermit Weeks.

In January 2022, the Hawaii Mars was the subject of multiple news articles when it was placed on sale by the company Platinum Fighter Sales for over $5 million. In June 2023, plans were being finalized for the transfer of the Hawaii Mars to the British Columbia Aviation Museum.

== Retirement ==
The last two JRM Mars aircraft, Hawaii Mars II and Philippine Mars were relocated to museums in 2024 and 2025, respectively.

=== Hawaii Mars II ===
On 1 April 2024, Coulson Aviation announced that Hawaii Mars would be donated to the British Columbia Aviation Museum, located at the Victoria International Airport in North Saanich, BC. On 28 March, the province of British Columbia provided a $250,000 grant to "protect and preserve" the plane.

On 25 April, Coulson Aviation announced that Philippine Mars would be donated to the Pima Air & Space Museum in Tucson, Arizona.

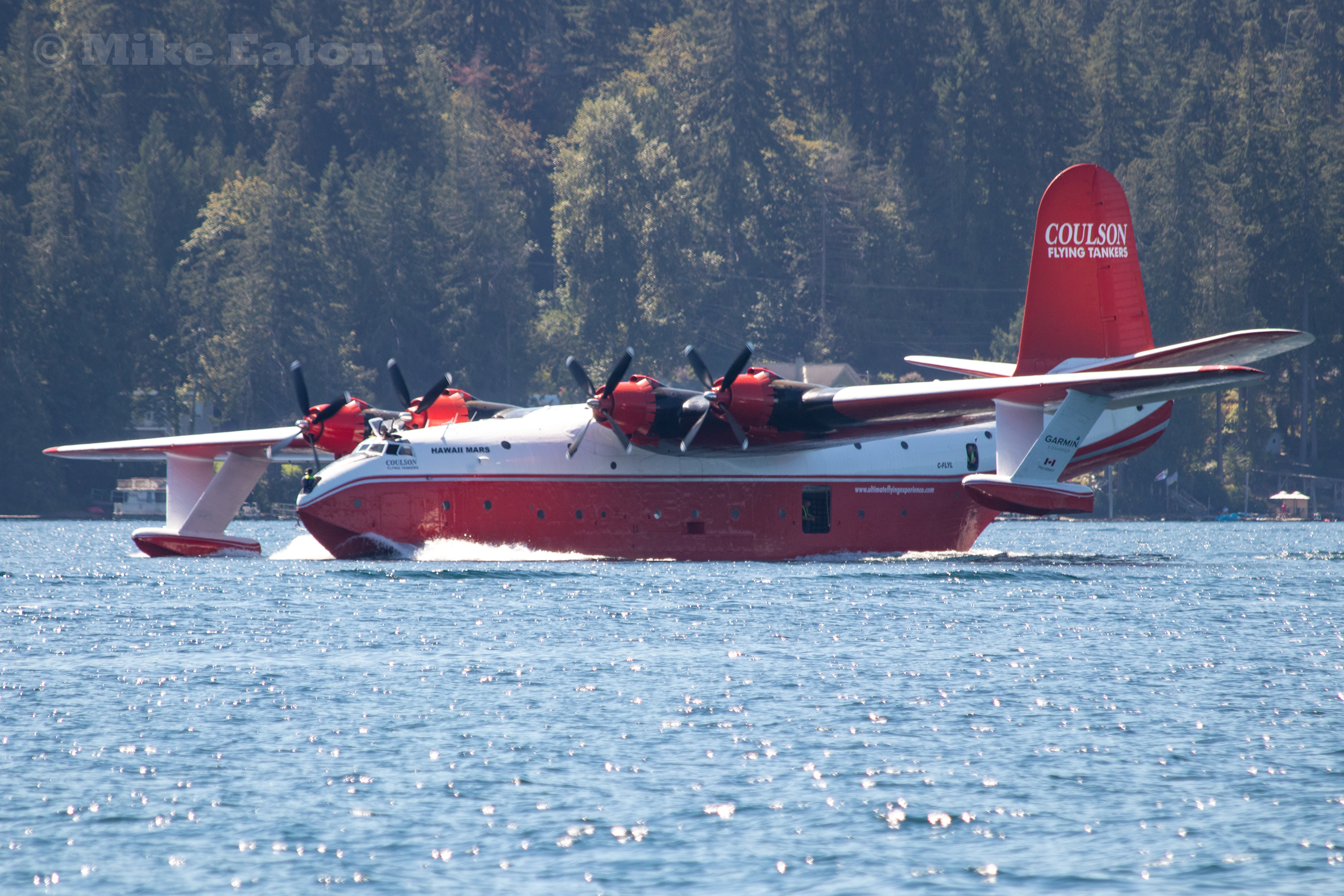
Hawaii Mars approaches its mooring on Sproat Lake after completing a high-speed taxi run as part of the VIP Experience Program, 3 August 2024.

On 4 June, Coulson Aviation announced that they would offer two packages that allowed customers to participate in a walkaround inspection and taxi the airplane on the water.

On 1 August, Hawaii Mars took flight for the first time since 2016, undertaking a short test flight before a technical issue required the in-flight shutdown and feathering of the number-four engine. After overnight repairs, the aircraft performed multiple other test flights coinciding with its "VIP Experience" program rides.

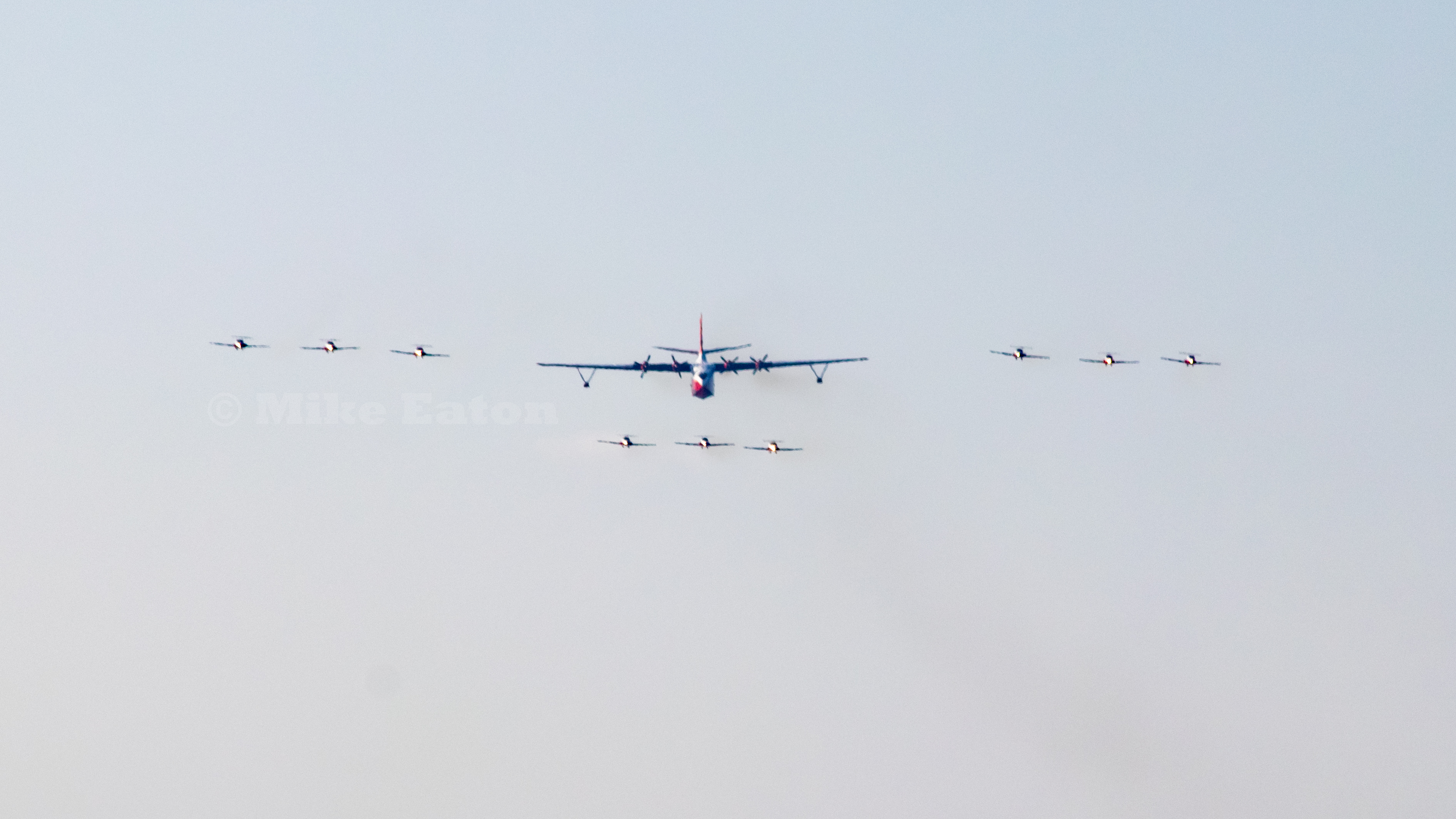
Hawaii Mars approaches Patricia Bay with the Canadian Forces Snowbirds in formation, surrounding the aircraft.

On 10 August, Hawaii Mars was flown around the Beaufort Range and Comox Glacier accompanied by a Short Skyvan photo ship. On board the latter were photographers tasked with capturing Hawaii Mars for media outlets including Skies Magazine.

On 11 August, Hawaii Mars left Sproat Lake on its final flight. It made celebratory low-passes of the Sproat Lake Bomber Base, Port Alberni Harbour Quay, and the city, before embarking on its journey around multiple communities "with a flight path from Port Alberni to Campbell River, Powell River, then back to Comox and down the coast to Victoria." Its arrival at Patricia Bay, accompanied by the Canadian Forces Snowbirds, was live streamed on YouTube.

On 14 August, Hawaii Mars was carefully manoeuvred past breakwaters at the Patricia Bay Coast Guard station. In the following days, the aircraft was carefully jacked onto a custom-built 360-degree swivelling trailer, and on 21 August was transported from the coast guard station to a parking spot at British Columbia Aviation Museum.

On 20 September, the BC Aviation Museum hosted a private ribbon cutting ceremony. Many former Mars crewmembers and the Coulson family were present.

On 28 September, Hawaii Mars was officially opened to the public. The BC Aviation Museum published a phased plan of work in which they state their aim to balance expected visitor numbers with preservation. The initial phases plan on increasing accessibility to the interior spaces, while keeping the Hawaii as close to its original specification as possible. Later phases include expanding interactive visitor attractions around the aircraft, and ultimately moving it to its own hangar for permanent display.

=== Philippine Mars ===
On 3 December 2024, Philippine Mars flew for the first time since 2007 as part of a series of test flights. Due to a cracked crank case on #2 engine (left inboard), the #2 engine from Hawaii Mars was installed on Philippine Mars. Subsequent test flights were successful and the aircraft was deemed ready for its final flights.

On 11 December, Philippine Mars departed Sproat Lake en route to San Francisco. However, as it passed North Nanaimo, an indication of low oil pressure in the #2 engine necessitated its shutdown prior to landing. The aircraft returned to the lake shortly afterward.

On 15 December, Philippine Mars made its second attempt at flying south. Due to fog on Sproat Lake it landed, taxied back up Taylor Arm and again departed, hours behind schedule. The flight followed the same initial route as the first attempt, then followed the east coast of Vancouver Island. The aircraft made low passes of Nanaimo Harbour, Nanaimo Airport (CYCD) and Ladysmith Harbour before climbing to 2,500 ft and proceeding toward Victoria International Airport, where it overflew Hawaii Mars. It then proceeded southeast toward the Puget Sound. As the aircraft neared Port Townsend, Washington, a sudden loss of oil pressure in the #4 (right outboard) engine necessitated an immediate in-flight shutdown. The crew made an immediate course reversal. Philippine Mars was seen flying over San Juan Island with its #4 engine shut down and propeller feathered as it returned to Patricia Bay. Philippine circled for nearly two hours before landing in the bay.

On 22 December, after engine maintenance at Patricia Bay, Philippine Mars was untied from its mooring for taxi-tests. Shortly after startup, the #4 engine began smoking, having suffered a contained complete failure and fire. The aircraft was towed back to its mooring and was effectively grounded pending replacement of the #4 engine.

On 6 January 2025, Philippine Mars was towed from Patricia Bay to Cowichan Bay by a Coulson tender. Repairs would be completed there, as Cowichan Bay provided sheltered waters, with the aircraft much closer to shore.

On 7 January, the serviceable #4 engine was removed from Hawaii Mars, and installed onto Philippine Mars.

On 10 January, Philippine Mars departed Cowichan Bay, following successful run-ups and taxi checks. The aircraft landed at the Sproat lake Bomber Base without incident.

On 9 February, Philippine Mars left Sproat Lake, lifting off at 11:03am PST. The aircraft made a fast pass of the bomber base, Harbour Quay and Port Alberni paper mill, before departing the area via the Alberni Inlet. Multiple general aviation aircraft were present in the area prior to, and during the departure. The aircraft was visible on several coastal webcams along its route of flight, up to and including its approach into San Francisco Bay. About midway through the journey, Philippine Mars was joined by two vintage aircraft, a privately registered Howard DGA-15 (N858H) and a Boeing Canso (N9767). Both aircraft followed Philippine for several miles between Lincoln City and Florence, Oregon. Following a successful landing in San Francisco Bay, Philippine was towed to a mooring buoy at the Alameda Seaplane Base, to await its final planned flight to Lake Pleasant, Arizona.

On 10 February, Philippine Mars departed San Francisco Bay for Lake Pleasant, lifting off at 11:57am PST. The aircraft flew outbound over the Golden Gate Bridge and followed the coast past Santa Cruz and Monterey before flying inland toward Arizona. As Philippine neared Palm Springs, California, it was joined by an array of historic aircraft, including a Consolidated PB4Y-2 Privateer (N2871G), as well as a P-51D Mustang (N44727), which escorted the aircraft the remaining distance to Lake Pleasant. Philippine Mars landed without incident, completing the last flight of a Martin Mars aircraft.

On 12 February, Philippine Mars was de-watered and removed from the lake via boat-ramp, to be prepared for relocation to its final resting place at Pima Air & Space Museum in Tucson, Arizona. Due its nature as a flying boat, which lacked any landing gear, and Pima Air and Space not bordering a suitable body of water, Philippine had to be transported the remaining distance by road. It was disassembled along its factory assembly joints, with the fuselage, wings, and tail being transported separately. The move was completed with the arrival of the fuselage on 16 May.

By 25 September 2025, Philippine Mars had been reassembled and placed on public display at its permanent home within Pima.

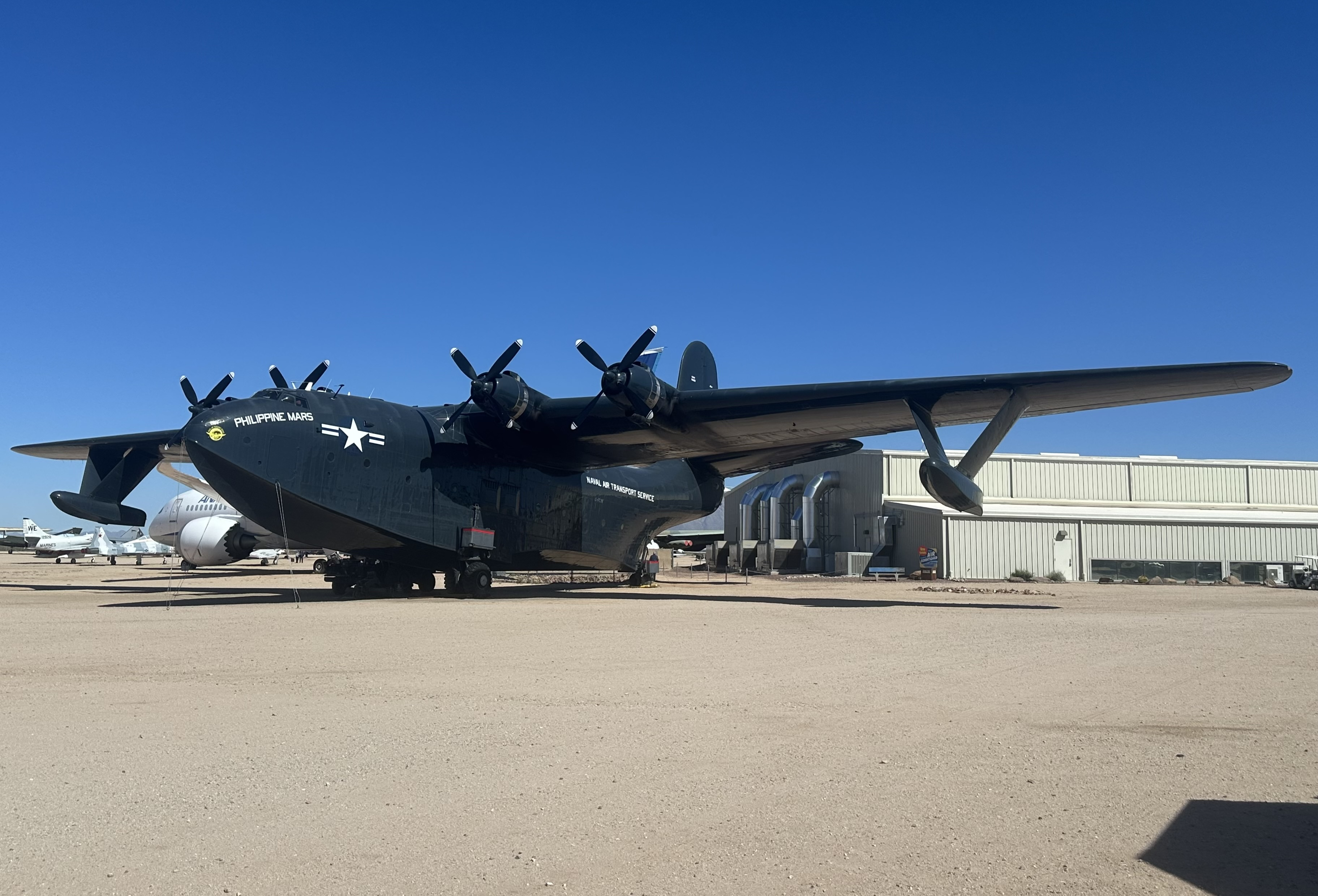
The Philippine Mars on display at Pima Air and Space on 6 March 2026. It is adjacent to the 787 prototype and detail restoration work is still in progress.

== Variants ==
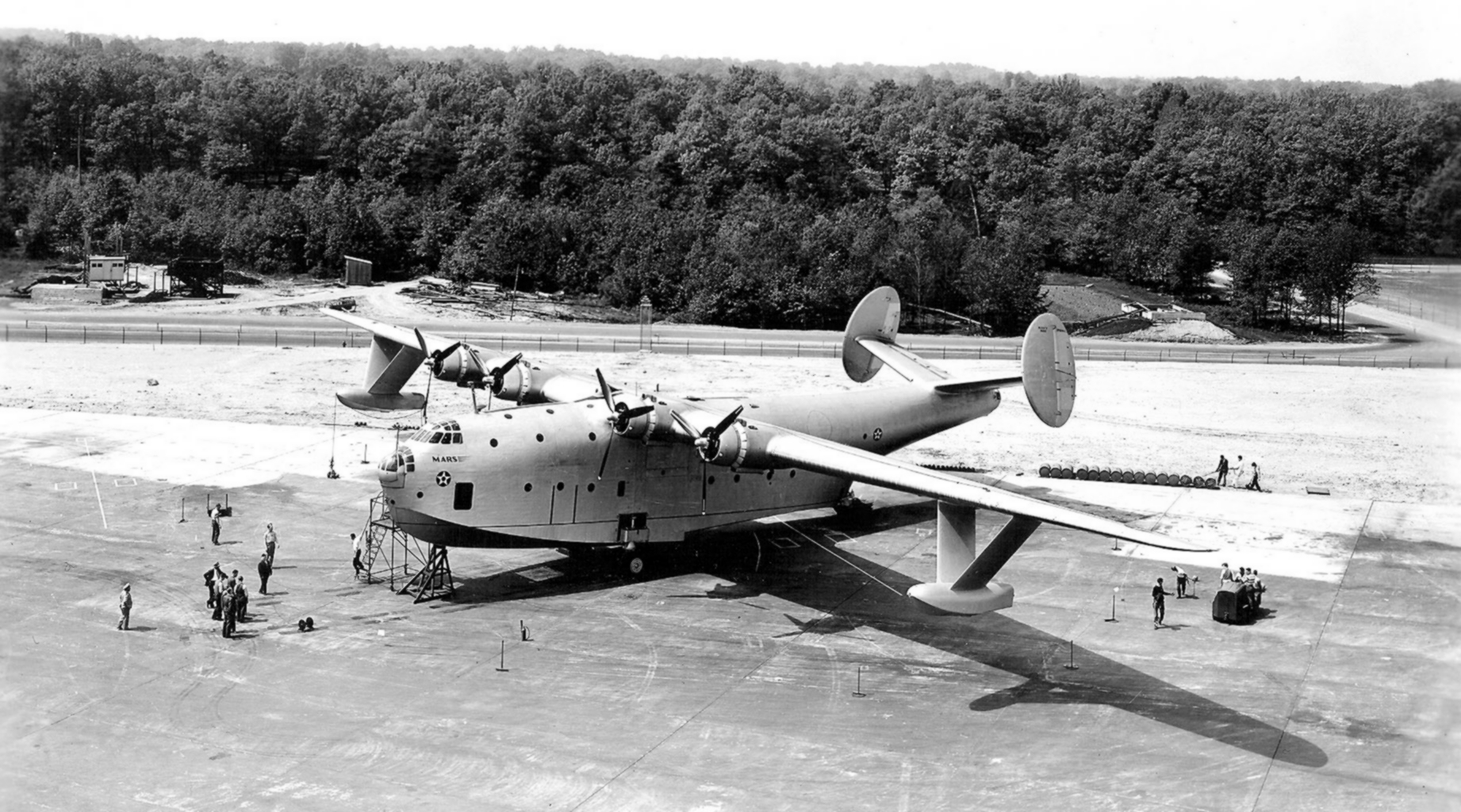
The XPB2M-1 in 1942

XPB2M-1
Model 170 prototype long-range patrol flying boat powered by four Wright R-3350-8 piston engines, one built, converted to XPB2M-1R.
XPB2M-1R
Prototype converted in December 1943 as a prototype transport version, armament removed, installation of additional cargo hatches and cargo loading equipment, existing hatches were enlarged and the decking was reinforced.
JRM-1
Model 170A, production long range transport variant, originally 20 aircraft ordered later reduced to six. Single-tail design, and having a longer hull with fewer bulkheads and a larger maximum take-off weight. It had also been fitted with equipment for overhead cargo handling and was powered by four Wright R-3350-24WA Cyclone engines with 4-bladed propellers, five built, surviving four converted to JRM-3.
JRM-2
The last JRM-1 on order was completed as the JRM-2 with the engines changed to 3,000 hp (2,200 kW) Pratt & Whitney R4360-4T engines with 4-blade, 16 ft 8 in (508 cm) diameter Curtiss Electric propellers. Gross weight increased by 20,000 lb (9,100 kg).
JRM-3
Model 170B, conversion of the remaining four JRM-1s re-engined with 2,400 hp (1,800 kW) Wright R3350-24WA engines turning 16 ft 8 in (508 cm) Curtiss-Electric props, of which the inboard two engines were fitted with reversible-pitch devices.

=== Aircraft ===
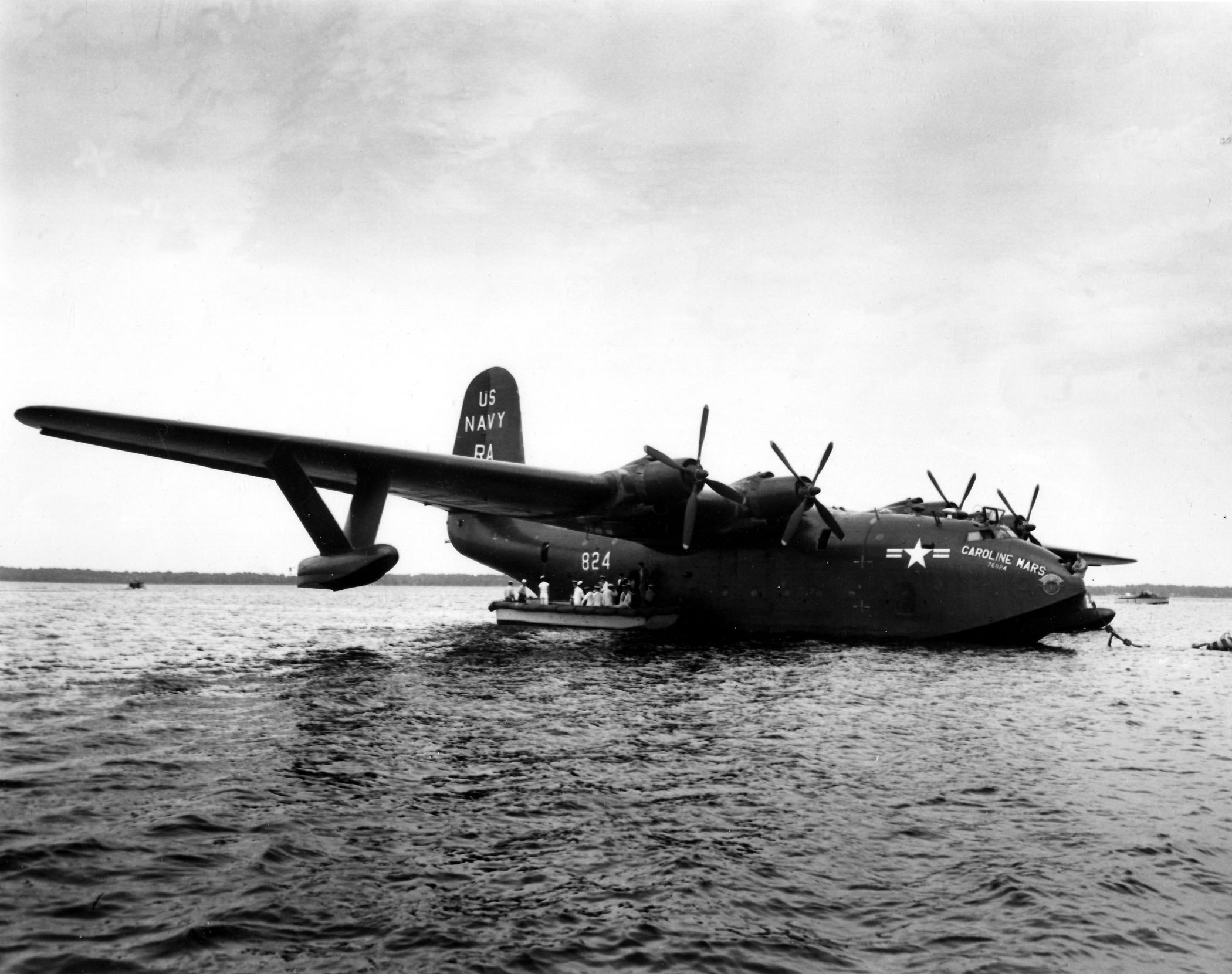
JRM-2 Caroline Mars in the St. Johns River at Naval Air Station Jacksonville, Florida in 1949

- The Old Lady – Bureau Number (BuNo) 1520. Ordered on 23 August 1938 and completed as the prototype long-range patrol XPB2M-1, it was first flown on 3 July 1942 and converted in December 1943 to transport variant and designated XPB2M-1R. Assigned initially to VR-8 at Naval Air Station Patuxent River, Maryland for crew training, it was later transferred to VR-2 at Naval Air Station Alameda, California and scrapped in 1945.
- Hawaii Mars I – JRM-1 BuNo 76819 first flown on 21 July 1945 and delivered to the United States Navy. It sank on 5 August 1945 in the Chesapeake Bay and was disposed as scrap.
- Philippine Mars – JRM-1 BuNo 76820, delivered to the United States Navy on 26 June 1946 and assigned to VR-2 at Naval Air Station Alameda, California. Converted and re-designated JRM-3. Withdrawn from service on 22 August 1956 and sold in 1959, it was converted to forest fire fighting aircraft and registered CF-LYK (later C-FLYK). The aircraft continued to fly with Flying Tankers Incorporated until she and the Hawaii Mars were purchased in 2007 by the Coulson Group. The Philippine Mars has not flown on fires since the summer of 2006 and was repainted to original U.S. Navy markings in preparation for transfer to be a museum display at the National Naval Aviation Museum at Naval Air Station Pensacola, Florida. The plan to ferry her to the museum in April or May 2016 was put on hold. Philippine Mars was later donated to the Pima Air & Space Museum, arriving there in May 2025.
- Marianas Mars – JRM-1 BuNo 76821, delivered to the United States Navy on 26 February 1946 and assigned to VR-2 at Naval Air Station Alameda. Converted and re-designated JRM-3, it was withdrawn from service on 22 August 1956 and sold in 1959. Converted to forest fire fighting aircraft and registered CF-LYJ, the aircraft crashed into Mount Moriarty near Nanaimo, Vancouver Island, on 23 June 1961, when the water drop mechanism failed, leaving the aircraft unable to climb quickly enough to clear a mountain. In the ensuing crash, the crew of four were killed.

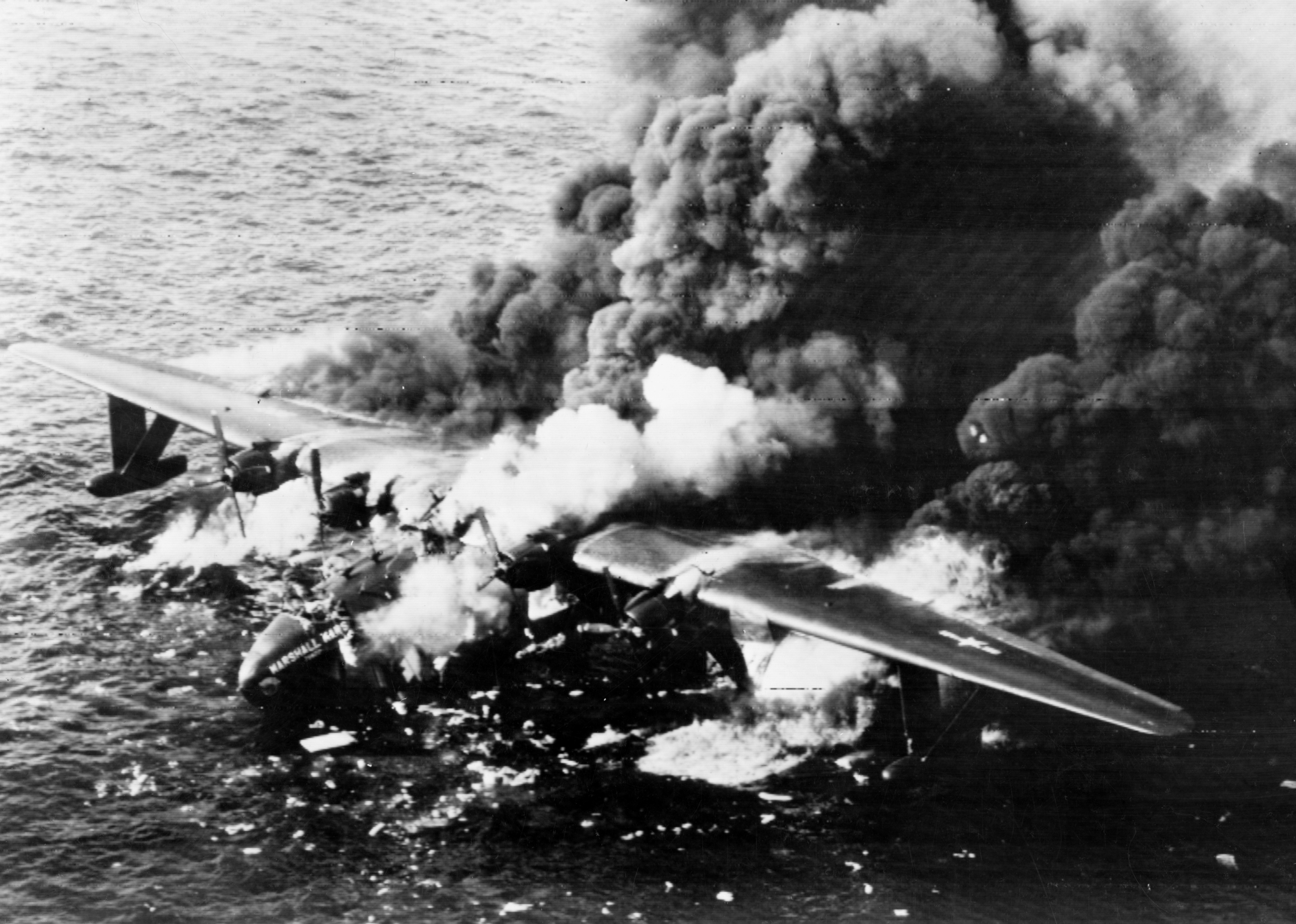
JRM-1 Marshall Mars burning near Honolulu, Hawaii, 5 April 1950

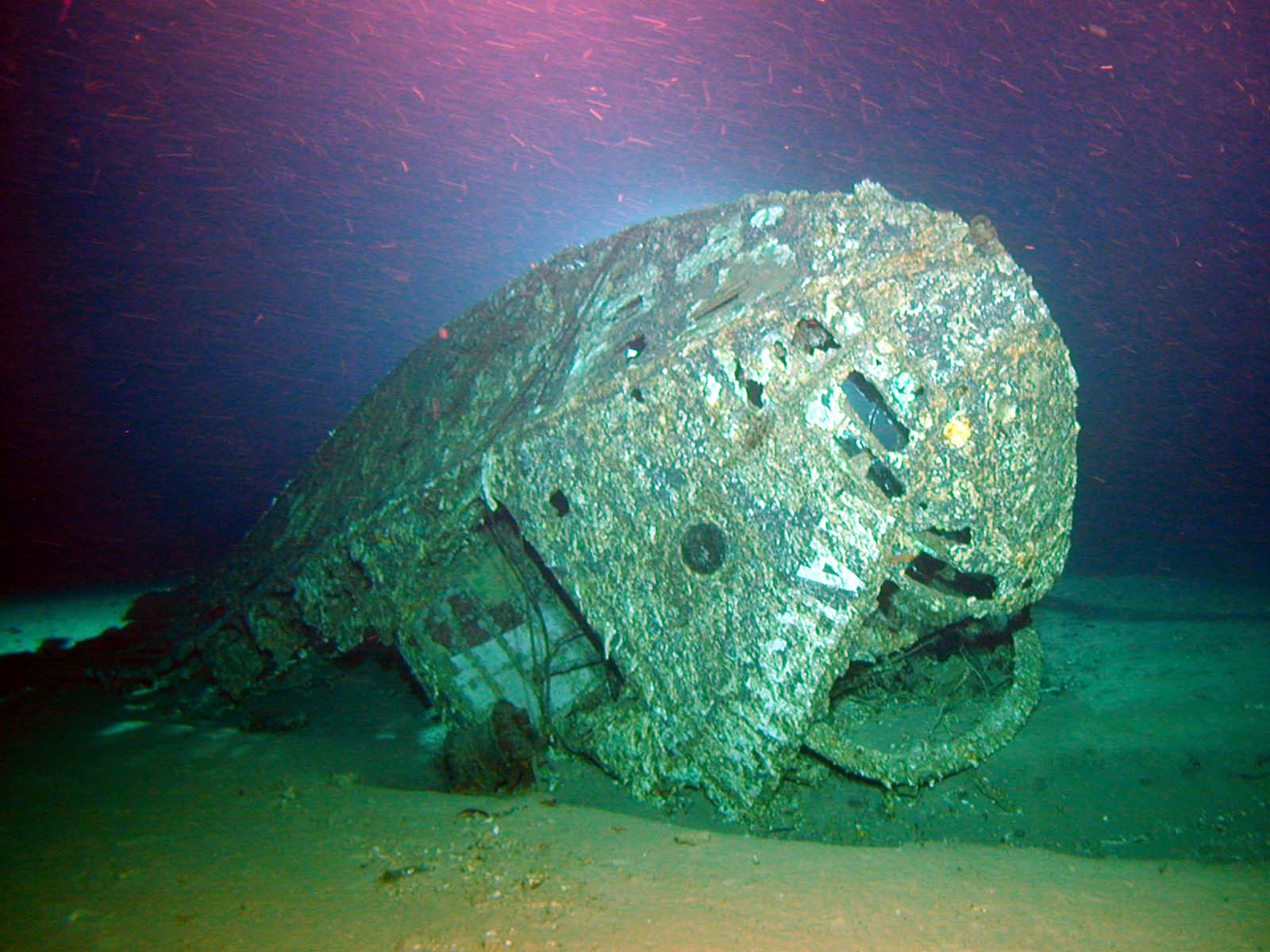
The nose of Marshall Mars, photographed by a joint NOAA, University of Hawaiʻi, National Park Service survey in 2004.

- Marshall Mars - JRM-1 BuNo 76822, delivered to the United States Navy, converted and re-designated JRM-3. It was destroyed by an engine fire and sank on 5 April 1950 off Diamond Head, Oahu, Hawaii.
- Hawaii Mars II – JRM-1 BuNo 76823, delivered to the United States Navy on 23 April 1946 and assigned to VR-2 at Naval Air Station Alameda. Converted and redesignated JRM-3, it was withdrawn from service on 22 August 1956 and sold in 1959. Converted to forest fire fighting aircraft and registered CF-LYL (later C-FLYL), it remains the only aircraft of this type in service and flew with FIFT (Forest Industries Flying Tankers), FTI (Flying Tankers Inc.) and the Coulson Group at Sproat Lake, British Columbia until 2013 and briefly in 2015. According to aircraft fleet information provided by the Coulson Aviation website, "Coulson Aviation has significantly upgraded the Hawaii, bringing it to the higher aviation and safety standards of modern-day firefighting. The next-generation Hawaii Mars has an EFIS glass cockpit and the ability to stream live data from certain key on-board indication systems. Other data available from the aircraft included real time flight tracking, load data measuring, aircraft performance statistics, atmospheric condition at drop readings, and accurate drop location reporting." The aircraft also is equipped with a satellite phone and cockpit voice recorder, Coulson Group Vice President Britt Coulson told CNN's Thom Patterson during a tour of the flight deck in 2016. It made its final flight to the BC Aviation Museum on August 11, 2024.
- Caroline Mars – JRM-2 BuNo 76824, delivered to the United States Navy on 10 May 1948 and assigned to VR-2 at Naval Air Station Alameda. It was sold in 1959 and converted to forest fire fighting aircraft by Forest Industry Flying Tankers. Registered CF-LYM. The aircraft was damaged beyond repair during Typhoon Freda at Victoria, Canada on 12 October 1962.
- "SHIP 8" – The unfinished nose section of what would have become the eighth Martin JRM aircraft. This nose section was originally acquired by Forest Industries Flying Tankers in the 1960s, and was stored at the Sproat lake Bomber Base near Port Alberni. It lay in the bush for decades before it was recovered by Coulson Aviation, and in 2007 placed on display at the Sproat Lake Visitor Centre. Currently, "SHIP 8" resides at the Sproat Lake Bomber base. The name "Ship 8" comes from several factory labels spray-painted on unrestored interior bulkheads of the unfinished section that read "SHIP8."

== Specifications (JRM-3 Mars) ==
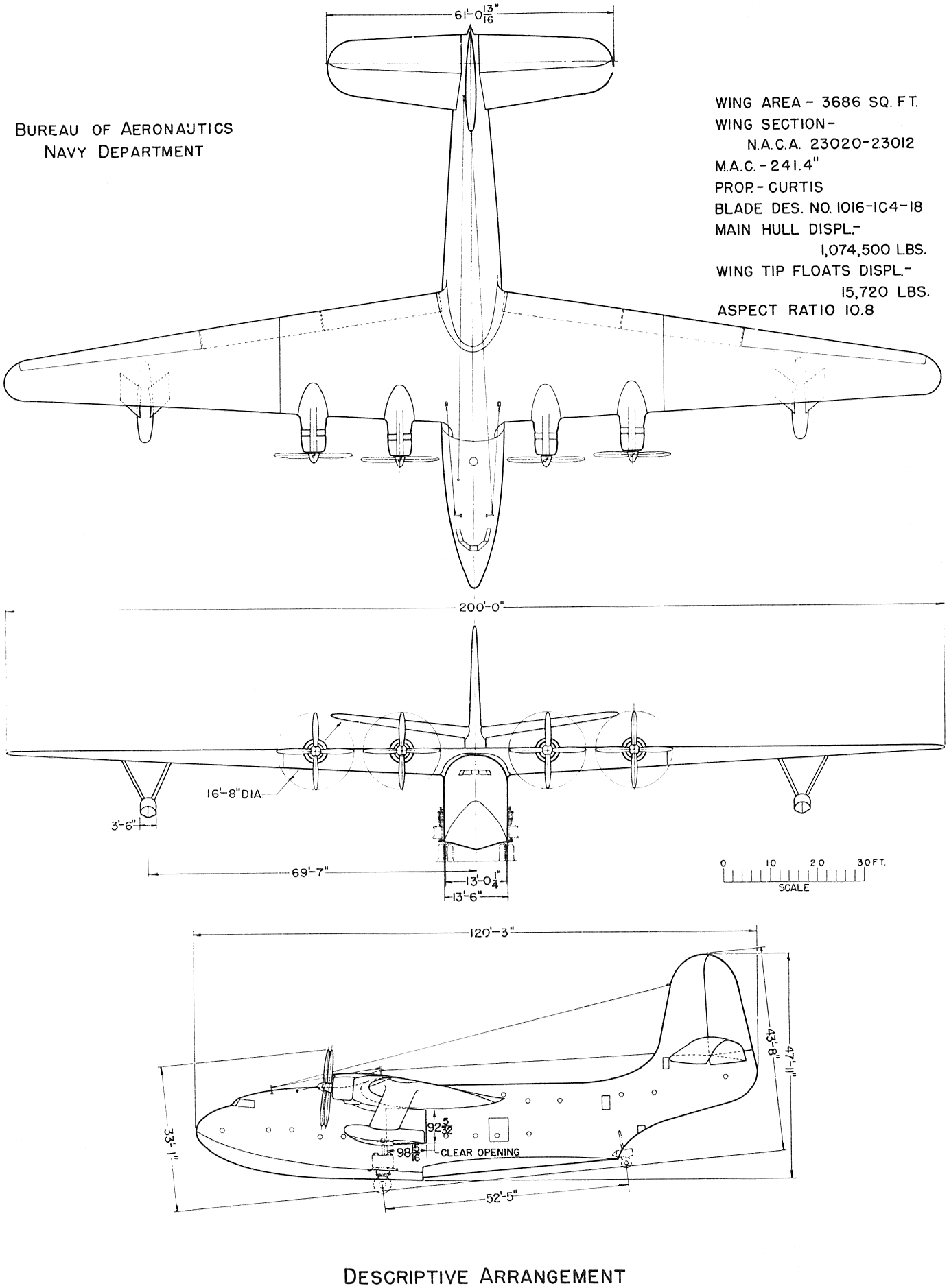
3-view line drawing of the Martin JRM-1 Mars

Data from Jane's Fighting Aircraft of World War II

General characteristics

- Crew: four (with accommodations for a second relief crew)
- Capacity: JRM Mars - 133 troops, or 84 litter patients and 25 attendants or 32,000 lb (15,000 kg) payload, including up to seven Willys MB jeeps
- Water/foam load: Mars waterbomber - 60,000 lb (27,000 kg)
- Length: 117 ft 3 in (35.74 m)
- Wingspan: 200 ft 0 in (60.96 m)
- Width: 13 ft 6 in (4.11 m) Hull beam
- Height: 38 ft 5 in (11.71 m) afloat, 48 ft (15 m) beached
- Hull draught: 5 ft 6 in (1.68 m)
- Wing area: 3,686 sq ft (342.4 m^{2})
- Empty weight: 75,573 lb (34,279 kg)
- Gross weight: 90,000 lb (40,823 kg)
- Max takeoff weight: 165,000 lb (74,843 kg)
- Fuel capacity: Hawaii Mars: 6,485 US gal (24,550 L; 5,400 imp gal) Philippine Mars: 13,200 US gal (50,000 L; 11,000 imp gal)
- Powerplant: 4 × Wright R-3350 Duplex-Cyclone 18-cylinder radial engines, 2,500 hp (1,900 kW) each
- Propellers: 4-bladed Curtiss Electric, 15 ft 2 in (4.62 m) diameter variable-pitch propellers

Performance

- Maximum speed: 221 mph (356 km/h, 192 kn)
- Cruise speed: 190 mph (310 km/h, 170 kn)
- Range: 4,900 mi (8,000 km, 4,300 nmi)
- Service ceiling: 14,600 ft (4,500 m)
- Drop speed: 138 mph (120 kn; 222 km/h)
- Landing approach speed: 115 mph (100 kn; 185 km/h)
- Touchdown speed: 92 mph (80 kn; 148 km/h)
- Fuel consumption (cruise): 420 US gal (1,600 L; 350 imp gal) per hour
- Fuel consumption (operations): 780 US gal (3,000 L; 650 imp gal) per hour
- Operations duration (normal): 5 1/2 hours
- Area covered, single drop: 3 to 4 acres (1.2 to 1.6 ha)
- Drop height: 150 to 200 ft (46 to 61 m)
- Full water tank load: 7,200 US gal (27,000 L; 6,000 imp gal)

== See also ==
Related development

- Martin PBM Mariner
- Martin 193

Aircraft of comparable role, configuration, and era

- Blohm & Voss BV 222
- Blohm & Voss BV 238
- Consolidated PB2Y Coronado
- Kawanishi H8K
- Saunders-Roe Princess
- Short Shetland
- Short Sunderland

Related lists

- List of aircraft of World War II
- List of flying boats and floatplanes
