= British Columbia Aviation Museum =

- Established: 1985
- Location: Victoria International Airport
- Coordinates: 48.6405°N 123.4208°W
- Type: Aviation museum
- Website: www.bcam.net

The British Columbia Aviation Museum is located in Sidney, British Columbia, Canada. It is on the grounds of the Victoria International Airport at 1910 Norseman Road on the east side of the airport.

The Museum consists of a display area spread over two hangars, a classroom, a restoration workshop and a gift shop. Displays include historical civilian and military artifacts including uniforms, medals and models. Aircraft are displayed and museum volunteers are constantly working on restoring new acquisitions.

== History ==
In September 2018 the museum acquired Avro Lancaster FM104, which is one of only 17 surviving Lancasters in the world. The aircraft, which was formerly in storage in Toronto, is now under restoration to airworthy status and will be finished in her post-War search-and-rescue configuration. In January 2021, the museum acquired an Grumman S2F Tracker that had been in storage with the Canadian Military Education Centre. The museum acquired a CF-104 in July 2023 and two Piasecki H-21s that September. In March 2024, the museum announced it was acquiring one of two surviving Martin Mars flying boats, the Hawaii Mars, from Coulson Aviation. The aircraft arrived at the museum on August 11, 2024 and is currently being prepared to be opened to the public on September 28th.

== Collection ==
=== Aircraft ===
Type	Identity
Auster AOP.6	C-FXNF as "16662"
Avro Anson	K8786 as "FP846"
Avro Lancaster	FM104
Beechcraft Model 18 (PacAero Tradewind)	CF-BCF
Bristol Bolingbroke	9104
Canadair CT-133 Silver Star	21462
Chanute-Type Glider 1896	
Canadair CT-114 Tutor	114175
DaVinci Ornithopter	
Douglas A-26 Invader	CF-BMS
Gibson Twin Plane	
Eastman E-2 Sea Rover	CF-ASY
Falconar AMF-S14 Super Maranda	
Fleet Model 2	CF-AOD
Lincoln Sport Aircraft	CF-AWA
Luscombe 8	CF-BSR
Martin JRM Mars	C-FLYL
Nieuport 17 (7/8-scale replica)	C-IRFC
Noorduyn Norseman	CF-DRE
North American Harvard IIB	3290
Pietenpol Air Camper	C-GSNS
Republic RC-3 Seabee	C-FLJC
Royal Aircraft Factory S.E.5 (7/8-scale replica)	F1910
Rutan Quickie	C-GTDV
Schreder Airmate HP-11	CF-QIR
Stinson Reliant	CF-OAZ
Supermarine Spitfire (3/4-scale replica)	
Trident TR-1 Trigull	C-GATE
Vickers Viscount	CF-THG

=== Helicopters ===
Type	Identifty
Aérospatiale Alouette III	C-FCAX
Bell 47	CF-FZX
RotorWay Scorpion II	N977
