= CCGS Revisor =

Canadian Coast Guard vessel

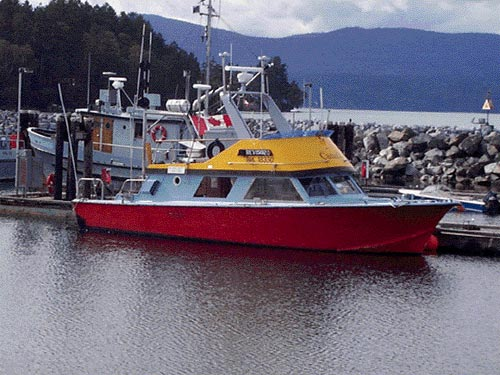
- CCGS Revisor with CCG livery painted out, while working with researchers from the Jet Propulsion Lab

History

Canada
- Name: Revisor
- Operator: Canadian Coast Guard (on loan to Jet Propulsion Lab)
- Builder: Canoe Cove Manufacturing Limited, Sidney, BC
- Commissioned: 1972
- In service: 1972
- Home port: Patricia Bay, BC
- Status: No longer in service

General characteristics
- Type: Inshore fisheries research and survey vessel
- Displacement: 10.5 gross tons
- Length: 12.2 m (40 ft 0 in)
- Beam: 3.8 m (12 ft 6 in)
- Draft: 0.8 m (2 ft 7 in)
- Propulsion: Diesel – 2 × Volvo Penta
- Speed: 17 knots (31 km/h)
- Range: 200 nmi (370 km)
- Endurance: 5 days
- Complement: 6
- Sensors & processing systems: 50nm Furino radar
- Aviation facilities: None

The Canadian Coast Guard Ship Revisor is a Canadian Coast Guard inshore fisheries research and survey vessel.

The boat is a Cabin cruiser (maximum of 2 passengers) for use for offshore hydrographic survey work. The Revisor has been decommissioned.

The vessel has been made available in the past for use by United States Government researchers with NASA's Jet Propulsion Lab in Pasadena, California, as well as university research work by the Seafloor Mapping Lab at California State University in Monterey Bay, California.

== CGS Base Patricia Bay ==
Most ships at this base are research vessels:

- CCGS John P. Tully – research vessel
- CCGS Vector – survey ship
- CCGS W. E. Ricker – research vessel
- CCGS Gordon Reid – search and rescue
