= Parkland Secondary School =

Location
- 10640 McDonald Park Rd. Sidney, British Columbia, V8L 5S7; Canada; 48.6706°N 123.4215°W

Information
- School type: Public, high school
- School board: sd63
- Principal: Kal Russell
- Grades: 9-12
- Enrollment: 500 (approx.)
- Language: English
- Team name: Panthers
- Website: parkland.sd63.bc.ca

Parkland Secondary School is a public secondary school in North Saanich, a suburb of Victoria, British Columbia, Canada. It is operated by School District 63 Saanich. It is one of three secondary schools in the school district and is located at the northern end of the Saanich Peninsula. The school serves the municipalities of North Saanich and Sidney as well as the nearby Pauquachin, Tsawout and Tseycum First Nations communities. International students from around the world comprise a significant percentage of the student enrollment. In 2018, Parkland Secondary introduced the International Baccalaureate program, making it the only public school on Vancouver Island to offer such a program. Parkland Secondary is fed primarily from North Saanich Middle School.

== Special programs ==
In addition to a full range of standard academic courses and athletics, the school also offers:

- Hockey Academy - utilizes the ice rink at nearby Panorama Recreation Centre.
- Judo Academy
- Outdoor Education - includes kayaking, canoeing, wilderness safety, first aid, outdoor survival skills, nutrition/dehydration, wilderness cooking, navigation, and environmental practices.
- Sailing Academy - in conjunction with the school's Marine Institute.
- International Baccalaureate- Provides a more advanced education for students to join in grades 11–12.

=== Marine Institute ===
The Marine Institute at Parkland was established in 2012. It is operated as a school academy, together with the Sailing Academy, to offer students a range of opportunities in academics, post-secondary credits and apprenticeships, trades certifications, environmental recreation, and sailing through both classroom-based instruction and on-the-water experience. The Marine Institute partners with the Institute of Ocean Sciences, a research station operated by the Government of Canada at nearby Patricia Bay. The Institute of Ocean Sciences is paired with a Canadian Coast Guard base which home-ports Canadian and Japanese offshore oceanographic research vessels and an Arctic ice-breaker.

== Saanich International Student Program ==
The Saanich International Student Program (SISP) is co-located at Parkland Secondary School. It serves students in grades 9–12 at Parkland Secondary, Stelly's Secondary School, and Claremont Secondary School. In the 2013–1014 academic year SISP students comprised approximately 15% of Parkland secondary's student population.

== Weather station ==
The University of Victoria operates a weather station at PSS as part of its School-Based Weather Station Network which gathers data from schools around Greater Victoria for its Climate Modelling Group of the School of Earth and Ocean Science. The data is collected at the university and used to provide meteorological forecasts online.

== Facilities ==
This school opened for the 1973–74 school year. A significant addition and upgrade was undertaken in 2003. The school was scheduled to undergo seismic upgrades in 2014–15.
