= CCGS W. E. Ricker =

Ship built in 1978

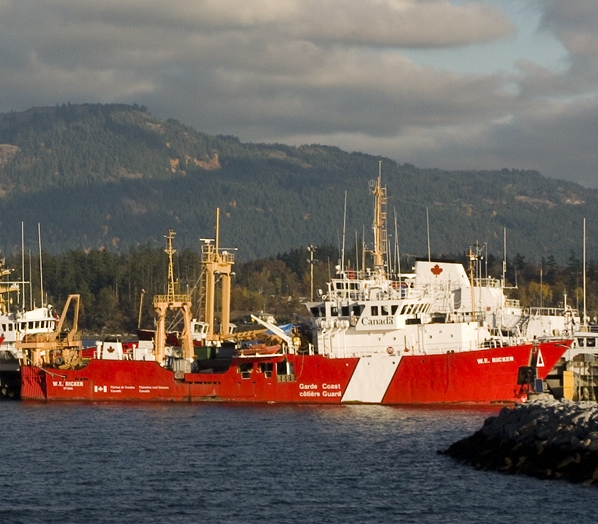
- CCGS W.E. Ricker at the Institute of Ocean Sciences, Patricia Bay, Sidney, British Columbia

History
- Name: Callistratus
- Builder: Narasaki Senpakukogyo Limited, Muroran, Japan
- Yard number: 922
- In service: December 1978
- Identification: IMO number: 7809364
- Fate: Sold 1984 to Canada

Canada
- Name: W.E. Ricker
- Operator: Canadian Coast Guard
- Port of registry: Ottawa, Ontario
- Acquired: 1984
- Commissioned: 1986
- Decommissioned: 14 March 2017
- Homeport: Patricia Bay, British Columbia
- Identification: CG2965
- Status: Being dismantled - November 2022 to February 2022

General characteristics
- Type: Fisheries research vessel
- Tonnage: 1,104.5 GRT; 419.9 NT
- Length: 58 m (190 ft 3 in)
- Beam: 9.5 m (31 ft 2 in)
- Draught: 4.5 m (14 ft 9 in)
- Propulsion: Diesel Akasaka AH 40 – 6 cyl engine
- Speed: 11.5 knots (21.3 km/h)
- Range: 6,000 nmi (11,000 km) at 10 kn (19 km/h)
- Endurance: 50 days
- Complement: 20

CCGS W.E. Ricker (Note: CCGS stands for Canadian Coast Guard Ship) was a Canadian Coast Guard offshore fisheries research vessel. The ship was originally constructed as the commercial fishing trawler Callistratus, but was purchased by the Government of Canada in 1984 and converted to a fisheries research vessel and renamed W.E. Ricker. The vessel entered service with the Department of Fisheries and Oceans in 1986 and was transferred to the Canadian Coast Guard in 1995 after the two fleets were amalgamated. The ship was assigned to the West Coast of Canada and was decommissioned on 14 March 2017.

== Design and description ==
W.E. Ricker was of a commercial stern fishing trawler design and was 58 m (190 ft 3 in) long overall with a beam of 9.5 m (31 ft 2 in) and a draught of 4.5 m (14 ft 9 in). The ship was propelled by one controllable pitch propeller driven by one Akasaka AH40 six-cylinder geared diesel engine, creating 1,863 kW (2,498 hp). W.E. Ricker also had one Perkins 2430 emergency generator. This gave the vessel a maximum speed of 11.5 knots (21.3 km/h). The research vessel had a fuel capacity of 290.00 m^{3} (63,790 imp gal) of diesel fuel, a range of 6,000 nautical miles (11,000 km) at 10 knots (19 km/h) and could stay at sea for up to 50 days. The ship had a complement of 20, composed of 9 officers and 11 crew with 17 spare berths.

== Service history ==
The ship was ordered from Narasaki Senpakukogyo Limited at their yard in Muroran, Japan with yard number 922. The vessel was completed in December 1978 as Callistratus. The vessel was used as a factory trawler by the Prince Rupert Fishermen's Co-operative Association participating in emerging North Pacific fisheries (North Pacific hake, turbot and rockfish) resulting from the extension of Canada's exclusive economic zone to 200 nautical miles (370 km) offshore. The vessel was purchased in 1984 by the Government of Canada for conversion to a fisheries research vessel in Pacific waters. The ship entered service with the Department of Fisheries and Oceans in 1986, renamed W.E. Ricker, for William Edwin (Bill) Ricker, a former chief scientist of the Fisheries Research Board who developed a mathematical model used for fish population dynamics.

In 1995, in an effort to combine tasks, administration and savings in both ships and funds, the Fisheries and Oceans and Canadian Coast Guard fleets were merged under the command of the Canadian Coast Guard. W.E. Ricker was given the new prefix CCGS as a result. The vessel continued to be used for fisheries research in Pacific waters. In September 2009 the Department of Fisheries and Oceans announced invitations for contracts to replace several of the Coast Guard's research vessels, including W.E. Ricker. The ship was taken out of service on 14 March 2017 due to a lack of seaworthiness. W.E. Ricker was put up for sale for scrap only due to the vessel's poor condition.

On 4 August 2020, a contract was awarded to Canadian Maritime Engineering Ltd. to dispose of W.E. Ricker. The dismantling is being completed at the Canadian Maritime Engineering Ltd Nanaimo B.C. Division. The contract has a completion date of the end of February 2022. During disassembly a worker was seriously injured by a falling beam.
