= Greg Wiltjer =

Canadian basketball player (born 1960)

Personal information
- Born: November 26, 1960 (age 65) Whitehorse, Yukon, Canada
- Listed height: 6 ft 11 in (2.11 m)
- Listed weight: 245 lb (111 kg)

Career information
- High school: Parkland (Sidney, British Columbia)
- College: North Idaho College (1979–1981); Oregon State (1981–1982); Victoria (1982–1984)
- NBA draft: 1984: 2nd round, 43rd overall pick
- Drafted by: Chicago Bulls
- Playing career: 1984–1997
- Position: Centre
- Number: 14

Career history
- 1984–1985: Basket Brescia
- 1985–1986: FC Barcelona
- 1986–1987: Cajamadrid
- 1987–1989: Aris Thessaloniki
- 1989–1992: Omaha Racers
- 1992-1993: Peñas Huesca
- 1992-1993: Oklahoma City Calvary
- 1993-1994: Atlético Echagüe
- 1993-1994: Quad City Thunder
- 1994–1995: Tours Joué Basket
- 1996-1997: Guialmi Estrelas

Career highlights
- FIBA European Cup Winners' Cup champion (1986); 2× Greek League champion (1988, 1989); 2× Greek Cup winner (1988, 1989); CBA champion (1993); CIAU First Team All-Canadian (1984); CIAU Championship MVP (1984); Canada West All-Star (1984); CIAU National Champion (1984)
- Stats at Basketball Reference
Medals
Representing Canada
Men's basketball
Universiade
Gold medal – first place	1983 Edmonton
Bronze medal – third place	1985 Kobe

Gregory Hilko Wiltjer (born November 26, 1960) is a Canadian former professional basketball player, Olympian, NJCAA All-American and CIAU All-Canadian. He was drafted 43rd overall in the 1984 NBA draft by the Chicago Bulls. He spent 12 seasons playing professionally in Europe where he won the FIBA European Cup Winners' Cup with FC Barcelona (1985–86); and two Greek League Championships and two Greek Cups (1988, 1989) with Aris Thessaloniki.

He played for the Canada men's national basketball team in multiple international tournaments, including the 1984 Olympics where Wiltjer finished 2nd overall in rebounding and Canada finished 4th overall in the tournament; in the 1983 World Student Games where Canada won gold; in the 1985 World Student Games where Canada won bronze; and in three FIBA World Championships.

He was named a NJCAA All-American while playing for North Idaho College and a CIAU All-Canadian while playing for the University of Victoria.

== Professional career ==
Wiltjer was selected in the second round (43rd overall) in the 1983 NBA Draft. He later played 12 seasons professionally in Europe. While playing for the Spanish Club FC Barcelona in the 1985–86 season, he won the FIBA European Cup Winners’ Cup. While playing for the Greek Club Aris Thessaloniki, he won two Greek League championships and two Greek Cups in 1988 and 1989. In the 1993–94 season, Wiltjer played for the CBA team Quad City Thunder, who won the CBA championship that year.

== International career ==
Wiltjer represented Canada in many international tournaments, including the 1984 Olympics. Wiltjer played well in these '84 Olympics, finishing second overall among all Olympians in rebounding that year. These 1984 Olympics were notable because Canada finished 4th overall, narrowly missing a medal. This 1984 bronze-medal game constituted the only time in 80+ years where Canada had a legitimate chance of winning an Olympic medal in basketball. This bronze medal game was highly competitive, being tied 18 times with 12 lead changes, with Canada being within one point with less than a minute of play remaining. Wiltjer "had a phenomenal game" in this important moment in Canadian basketball history, scoring 12 points and grabbing 8 rebounds.

Wiltjer represented Canada in the 1983 and 1985 World Student Games. In the 1983 World Student Games, Canada won the gold medal. This constituted one of the finest moments in Canadian basketball history, being the only time in which Canada has won the gold medal in an international basketball tournament. In the semifinals of this tournament, Canada defeated a talented US team led by future NBA legends Charles Barkley and Karl Malone. In the 1985 World Student Games, Canada won the bronze medal.

Wiltjer also represented Canada in three FIBA World Championships (1982, 1986, 1994) where notably, Canada finished 6th in 1982.

== High school / college / university ==
Wiltjer attended Parkland Secondary School for high school, where in 1979, he led the team to Island championship and the semifinals of the BC high school championship.

Witljer then played two seasons for Northern Idaho College (1979 - 1981). Prior to 2009, he was NIC's only first-team NJCAA basketball All-American. He led NIC to the most wins in school history in 1980 and a 10th place national finish. He still ranks fourth in NIC career rebounding and field goal percentage.

The next season Wiltjer transferred to Oregon State University, with the Beavers reaching the NCAA Elite Eight that season.

Wiltjer then transferred to the University of Victoria and after a mandatory year of non-play due to the transfer, he helped UVic win their fifth consecutive national championship in the 1983–84 season. During this season, he was named a First Team All-Canadian, the CIAU Championship MVP and Canada West First Team All-Star. He averaged over 20 points and 11 rebounds per game and helped UVic go undefeated that season.

== Post career ==
Wiltjer was inducted into the Canada Basketball Hall of Fame (2023), the Basketball BC Hall of Fame (2009) and the Northern Idaho College Sports Hall of Fame (2009).

== Personal ==
Wiltjer was born on November 26, 1960, in Whitehorse, Yukon, Canada. Wiltjer's son, Kyle Wiltjer, played basketball for Kentucky, Gonzaga, the Houston Rockets and as of 2023, plays professionally in Italy. Greg Wilter's daughter, Jordan Adams played basketball for New Mexico and the Minnesota Lynx.

== Sources ==
- www.frozenhoops.com
- www.thedraftreview.com
- www.westlinntidings.com
- "U.S. Beats Canadians Without Bird, Stockton; Guard Injures Calf in 105-61 Victory". The Washington Post. June 30, 1992. Archived from the original on November 4, 2012 – via HighBeam Research.
- www.oregonlive.com
