= CCGS Vector =

Canadian survey ship built in 1967

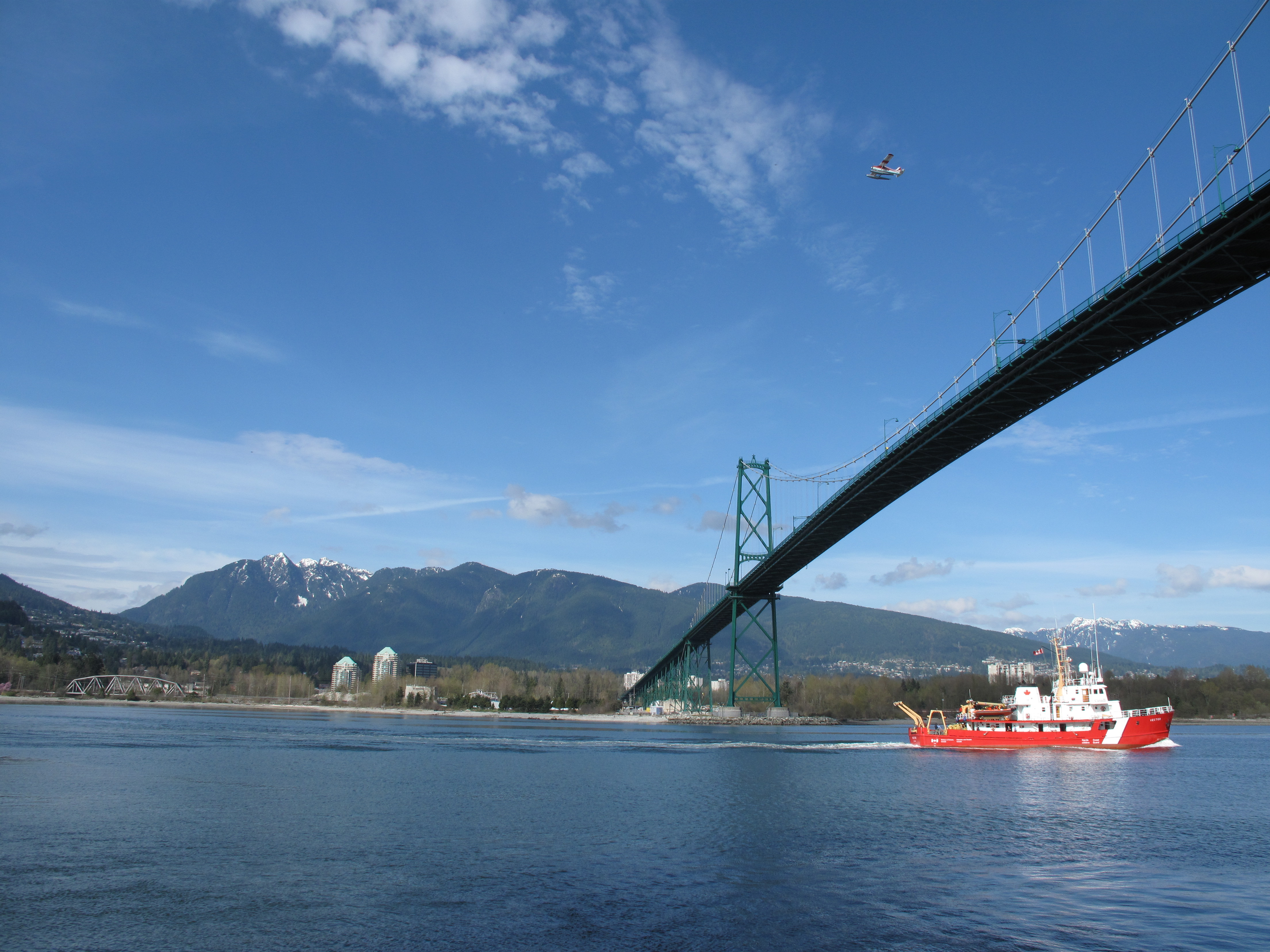
- CCGS Vector entering Vancouver's harbour

History

Canada
- Name: Vector
- Operator: Canadian Coast Guard
- Port of registry: Ottawa, Ontario
- Builder: Yarrows Ltd., Esquimalt
- Yard number: 293
- Laid down: September 1966
- Launched: 23 May 1967
- Completed: November 1967
- Commissioned: 1967
- In service: 1967–present
- Refit: 1985
- Home port: CGS Base Patricia Bay, Sidney, British Columbia – Pacific Region
- Identification: CGBW; IMO number: 6717760
- Status: in active service

General characteristics
- Type: Hydrographic survey ship
- Tonnage: 516 GT; 187 NT
- Length: 39.7 m (130 ft 3 in)
- Beam: 9.5 m (31 ft 2 in)
- Draught: 3.5 m (11 ft 6 in)
- Propulsion: Caterpillar 3408 diesel engine
- Speed: 12 knots (22 km/h)
- Range: 3,500 nmi (6,500 km) at 10 knots (19 km/h)
- Endurance: 16 days
- Complement: 13

CCGS Vector (Note: CCGS stands for Canadian Coast Guard Ship) is a hydrographic survey vessel in the Canadian Coast Guard. The ship was constructed in Canada and entered service in 1967 as a coastal research vessel on the West Coast. The ship is currently in service, based at Canadian Coast Guard Base Patricia Bay in Sidney, British Columbia.

== Description ==
Vector is 39.7 metres (130 ft 3 in) long with a beam of 9.5 metres (31 ft 2 in) and a draught of 3.5 metres (11 ft 6 in). The ship has a tonnage of 516 gross tonnage (GT) and a 187 net tonnage (NT). The vessel is powered by Caterpillar 3408 geared diesel engine creating 615 kilowatts (825 hp) and two Caterpillar 3306 generators driving one controllable pitch propeller and bow thrusters. This gives Vector a maximum speed of 12 knots (22 km/h). The ship can carry 74 m^{3} (16,000 imp gal) of diesel fuel giving Vector a range of 3,500 nautical miles (6,500 km) at a cruising speed of 10 knots (19 km/h) and an endurance of 12 days. The survey vessel has a complement of 13, with 5 officers and 8 crew, along with 8 additional berths. Vector has 86.4 m (283 ft) of laboratory space aboard and 56 m^{2} (600 sq ft) of cargo space on the main deck The ship is equipped with Sperry Marine Bridgemaster radar, working on the E-X bands.

== Service history ==
Vector was constructed by Yarrow Shipyards at their yard in Esquimalt, British Columbia. The ship was laid down in September 1966 and given the yard number 293. Vector was launched on 23 May 1967 and completed in November later that year. The ship entered service on the West Coast in 1967 for coastal hydrographic research use. The ship is based at the Institute for Ocean Sciences in Sidney, British Columbia.

== Sources ==
- "CCG Fleet: Vessel Details – CCGS Vector". Canadian Coast Guard. 24 March 2017. Archived from the original on 23 September 2017.
- Maginley, Charles D. & Collin, Bernard (2001). The Ships of Canada's Marine Services. St. Catharines, Ontario: Vanwell Publishing Limited. ISBN 1-55125-070-5.
- "Vector (6717760)". Miramar Ship Index.
- Saunders, Stephen, ed. (2004). Jane's Fighting Ships 2004–2005 (107 ed.). Alexandria, Virginia: Jane's Information Group Inc. ISBN 0-7106-2623-1.
- Saunders, Stephen, ed. (2009). Jane's Fighting Ships 2009–2010 (112 ed.). Alexandria, Virginia: Jane's Information Group Inc. ISBN 978-0-7106-2888-6.
