= Kyla Lee =

Canadian lawyer and writer

- Born: Victoria, British Columbia, Canada
- Citizenship: Canada
- Education: Stelly's Secondary School; University of British Columbia; Peter A. Allard School of Law (JD)
- Occupations: Lawyer; Writer
- Known for: Criminal defence law
- Notable work: Cross-Examination: The Pinpoint Method; Immediate Roadside Prohibitions in Western Canada; Sit Still Jackson
- Board member of: British Columbia Civil Liberties Association

Kyla Lee is a Canadian Métis lawyer, writer, and commentator based in Vancouver, British Columbia. She is the author of Cross-Examination: The Pinpoint Method, Immediate Roadside Prohibitions in Western Canada, Sit Still Jackson. She specializes in criminal defence law.

== Early life and education ==
Lee was born in Victoria, British Columbia in a Métis family. She grew up in Saanichton. She graduated from Stelly's Secondary School. She completed her undergraduate degree at the University of British Columbia in the First Nations Studies Program with a minor in English literature before earning a JD from UBC's Peter A. Allard School of Law. She initially considered Indigenous law but chose criminal law during her studies.

== Career ==
=== Legal ===
Lee practices at Acumen Law Corporation in Vancouver and has appeared at all levels of court in British Columbia, and at the Supreme Court of Canada. She has also presented to federal committees in Ottawa and to the House of Commons Standing Committee on Justice and Human Rights concerning Bills C-46 and C-51. She also funds the Kyla Lee Indigenous Law Students Award at the Peter A. Allard School of Law.

=== Media ===
Since 2021, Lee has been a weekly panelist on CBC Vancouver's On the Coast with host Gloria Macarenko and co-panelist Mo Amir, and contributes to the show's Soapbox Social segment. Previously, RadioNL in Kamloops featured her in regular Monday morning legal segments for many years. Lee is also a regular guest on the Mike Smyth Show on CKNW, where she provides live advice to callers about their traffic court and driving law questions. She is also a regular panelist on the ChekTV show, This is Vancolour, hosted by Mo Amir in a segment called Kyla's Court.

Lee hosts the podcast Driving Law, which discusses criminal law issues in British Columbia and Canada. She also produces the video series Cases That Should Have Gone to the Supreme Court of Canada, But Didn't.

=== Administration ===
Lee has held extensive roles in the Canadian Bar Association including as the Chair of the Criminal Law Section, the Chair of the Women Lawyers Forum, and is currently the Chair of the Sexual and Gender Diversity Alliance. In the CBA's British Columbia Branch she is the Law and Policy Liaison for both the SAGDA and Criminal Justice sections, where she contributes to the development of CBA policy and legal issues. She also serves as Vice President of Training in the DUI Defence Lawyers Association, and has previously served as the Parliamentarian.

Lee is the British Columbia Vice President for the Women in Canadian Criminal Defence organization. She served as lead counsel to the Women in Canadian Criminal Defence as intervenor at the Supreme Court of Canada in R. v. Korduner. She is also a Guest Contributor for Professor Peter Sankoff's Criminal Defence Essentials.

Lee is actively involved in the British Columbia Civil Liberties Association and is a member of the board of directors and the executive committee.

=== Writing ===
Lee has written legal books including Cross-Examination: The Pinpoint Method and Immediate Roadside Prohibitions in Western Canada, both published by LexisNexis Canada in 2021. In 2023, she also published the children's book Sit Still Jackson. She also has been a contributing columnist to the Huffington Post, Vancouver Is Awesome, and Law360.

=== Business ===
In 2024, Lee opened a distillery called Deep Blue Distilleries in Richmond.

== Controversy ==
In November 2015, the Attorney General of British Columbia launched a court application against Lee and her firm, ultimately ending up before the BC Court of Appeal in British Columbia (Attorney General) v. Lee, 2017 BCCA 219.

The application sought to have certain documents that had been disclosed to Lee in a Freedom of Information and Protection of Privacy Act request and to enjoin Lee and Acumen Law acting as counsel in any impaired driving or immediate roadside prohibition case. The request for that relief was withdrawn at the hearing. Lee was represented by constitutional lawyer Joseph Arvay.
