= Jamie Benn =

Canadian ice hockey player (born 1989)

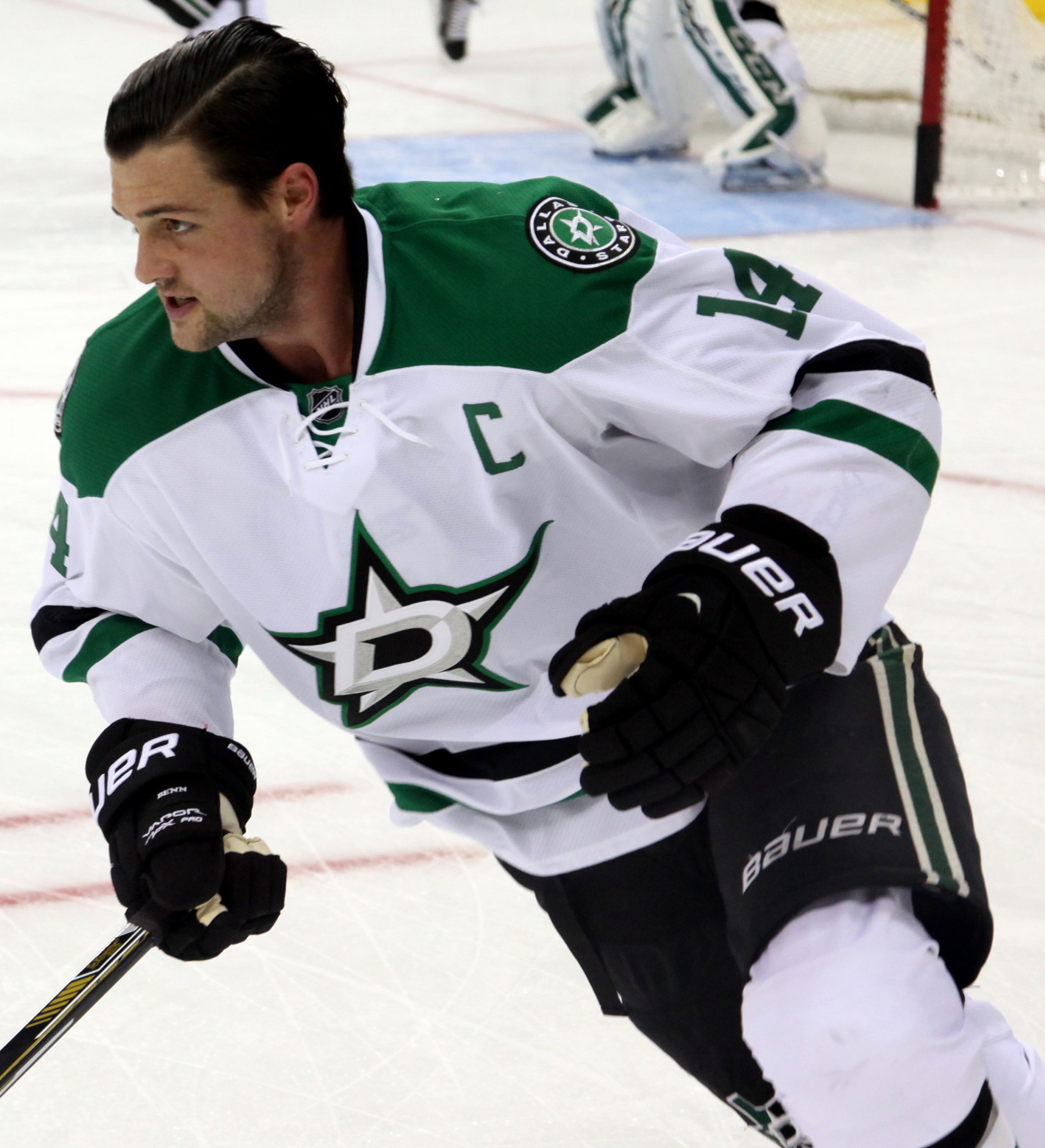
- Benn with the Dallas Stars in October 2014
- Born: July 18, 1989 (age 37) Victoria, British Columbia, Canada
- Height: 6 ft 2 in (188 cm)
- Weight: 210 lb (95 kg; 15 st 0 lb)
- Position: Forward
- Shoots: Left
- NHL team Former teams: Dallas Stars; Hamburg Freezers
- National team: Canada
- NHL draft: 129th overall, 2007; Dallas Stars
- Playing career: 2009–present

Jamie Randolph Benn (born July 18, 1989) is a Canadian professional ice hockey player who is a forward and captain for the Dallas Stars of the National Hockey League (NHL).

In the 2007 NHL entry draft, Benn was drafted by the Dallas Stars 129th overall. He played his junior hockey career with the Kelowna Rockets of the Western Hockey League (WHL). He represented Canada at the 2009 World Junior Ice Hockey Championships, where he helped capture a gold medal. With Team Canada, he won a gold medal at the 2014 Winter Olympics in Sochi, Russia. In the 2014–15 season, Benn was awarded the Art Ross Trophy as the league's leader in points while also being the runner-up for the award the following season. The Stars went to the 2020 Stanley Cup Final under his leadership.

== Playing career ==
=== Junior ===
Benn grew up playing hockey for the Peninsula Eagles minor hockey association and attended Stelly's Secondary School as a teenager. He played for the Peninsula Panthers of the Vancouver Island Junior Hockey League (VIJHL), a local Junior B team located in North Saanich, British Columbia, during the 2005–06 season. Following this, he played for the Victoria Grizzlies of the Junior A British Columbia Hockey League (BCHL) for parts of three seasons from 2006–2008.

==== Kelowna Rockets ====
Benn was drafted by the Dallas Stars 129th overall in the 2007 NHL entry draft from the Victoria Grizzlies. Following his draft, Benn began his major junior career with the Kelowna Rockets in the WHL. He scored 65 points in his rookie season in 2007–08, then improved to a team-high 46 goals along with 36 assists for 82 points in 56 games in the 2008–09 season. After being named to the WHL West first All-Star team, Benn paced the Rockets with a playoff-leading 33 points en route to the 2009 Ed Chynoweth Cup title. In the subsequent 2009 Memorial Cup tournament, held in Rimouski, Quebec, Benn notched a four-goal game and added an assist in the second round-robin match against the Drummondville Voltigeurs, a 6–4 win, to secure the Rockets a berth in the tournament final. Although the Rockets lost to the Windsor Spitfires 4–1 in the Final, Benn was named to the Tournament All-Star team, along with teammate Tyler Myers.

=== Dallas Stars (2009–present) ===
==== Early seasons in Dallas (2009–2013) ====
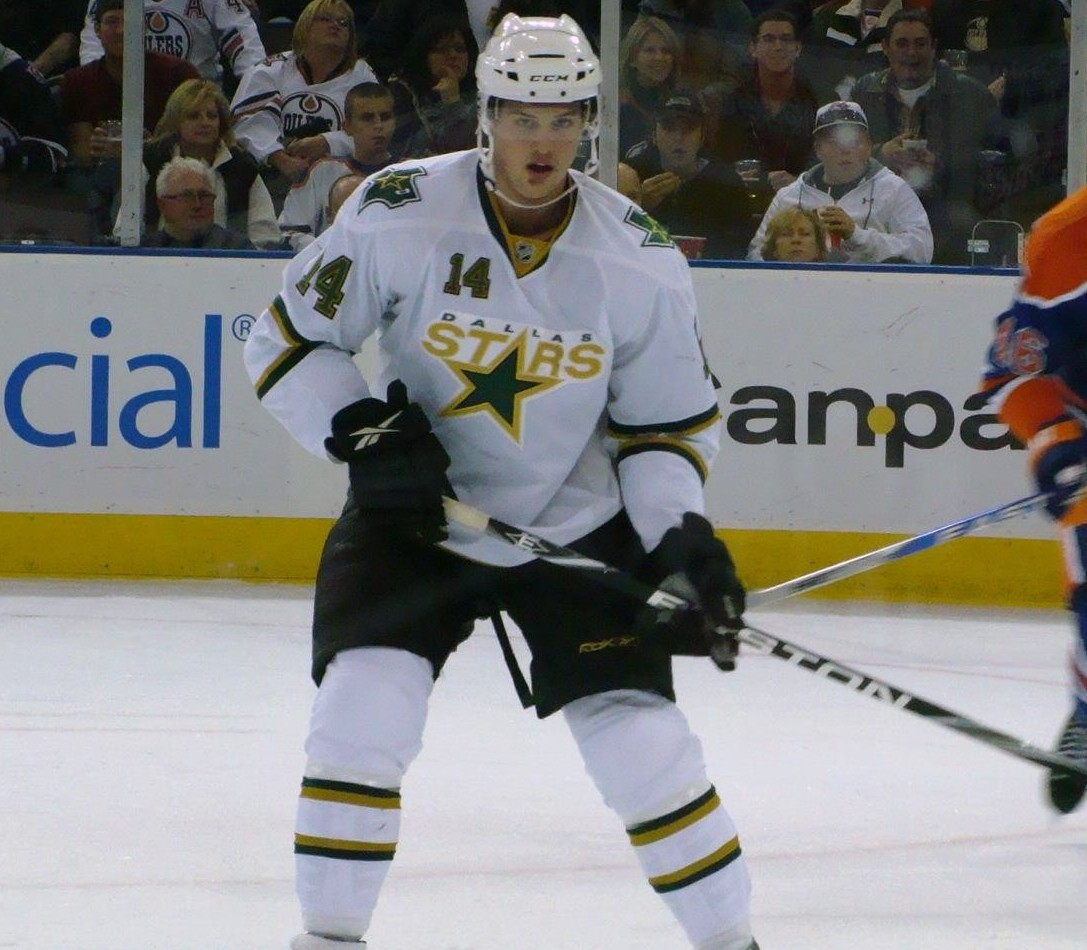
Benn with the Stars in October 2009. The 2009–10 season was his rookie season in the NHL.

Benn made the Dallas Stars' roster for the 2009–10 season and made his NHL debut in the season opener on October 3, 2009, in a 3–2 shootout loss to the Nashville Predators. Benn and scored his first NHL goal in his fourth NHL game on October 11 against Roberto Luongo of the Vancouver Canucks. Benn tied the score 3–3 late in the game, but the Stars lost 4–3 later in the shootout.

After playing all 82 games for the Stars in 2009–10, his rookie season, he was sent down to the Stars' AHL affiliate, the Texas Stars, for the 2010 Calder Cup playoffs. He scored 14 goals, 12 assists and had 26 points in 24 playoffs games as Texas fell to the Hershey Bears in the Calder Cup Finals. Benn later spoke of the experience, "I had a fun summer here...it was a big part of my hockey career and helped me develop my game. I definitely loved playing here."

On October 9, 2010, in a 5–3 win over the New York Islanders, Benn suffered a concussion as a result of a hit from Islanders' defenceman James Wisniewski, resulting in Benn missing the next three games. On January 24, 2011, in a 7–1 loss against the Vancouver Canucks, Benn sustained what appeared to be a separated shoulder from a collision with Canucks' defenceman Alexander Edler, resulting in him missing the next 10 games. Benn ended his sophomore season with 22 goals and 34 assists for 56 points in 69 games as the Stars heavily improved as a team, missing the 2011 playoffs by two points.

After recovering from an emergency appendectomy and missing five games, Benn participated in his first career All-Star game as he was named to team Chara. He ended the 2011–12 season with 26 goals and 37 assists for 63 points in 71 games as the Stars as a team once again missed out on the playoffs despite having a winning record, missing by six points.

With the 2012–13 season delayed due to the labour lock-out, Benn signed a contract for the duration of the dispute with the Hamburg Freezers of the German DEL on October 2, 2012. Unable to initially agree to a contract with the Stars, Benn missed the first four games of the shortened NHL season before re-signing to a five-year, $26.25 million contract on January 24, 2013. On March 18, Benn recorded his 100th NHL assist on a Loui Eriksson goal in a 4–3 win over the Calgary Flames.

==== Rising team and individual success, beginning captaincy (2013–2023) ====
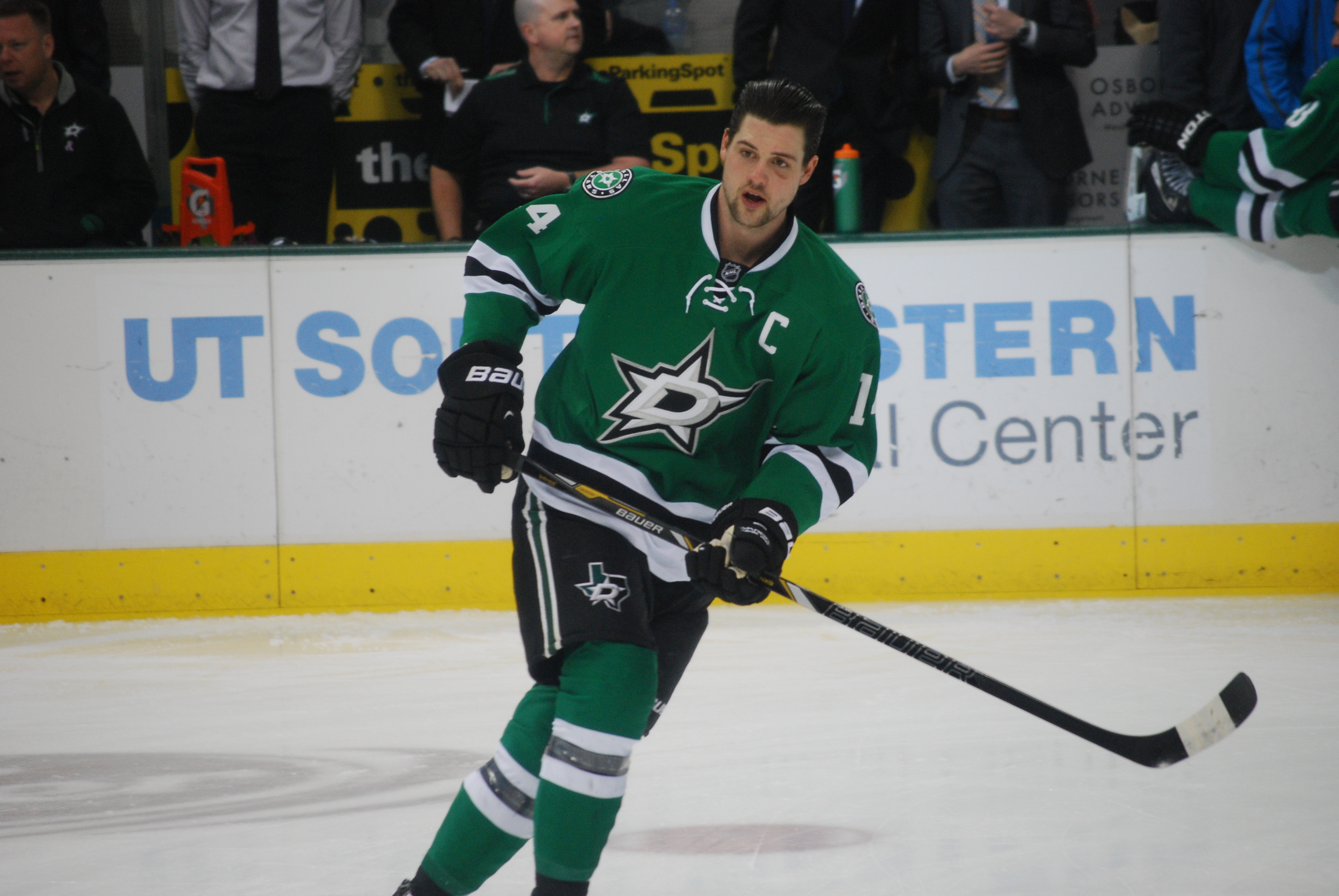
Benn was named the captain of the Stars during the 2013 off-season.

Benn was named the sixth captain of the Dallas Stars on September 19, 2013. On January 23, 2014, Benn recorded his 100th NHL goal in a 7–1 victory against the Toronto Maple Leafs. During the 2013–14 season, his fifth NHL season and first year of captaincy, Benn had his first breakout season as he recorded 34 goals, 45 assists and 79 points in 80 games to help the Stars clinch a playoff spot for the first time with him on the team, finishing as the eighth and final seed in the West. Benn made his Stanley Cup playoff debut on April 16 against the Anaheim Ducks and scored his first playoff goal on Ducks goaltender Frederik Andersen. The Stars would eventually get defeated in the opening round of the 2014 playoffs by the top-seeded Ducks in six games.

On February 17, 2015, Benn scored his first career hat trick in a 4-1 win over the St. Louis Blues. On March 23, Benn recorded his 200th NHL assist on a goal by Patrick Eaves in a 4–3 win over the Buffalo Sabres. On April 11, Benn scored 4 points in the Stars' last regular season game to finish with 87 points on the season and win the Art Ross Trophy. His final point, a secondary assist on a goal by Cody Eakin with 8.5 seconds left in the game, allowed him to overtake New York Islanders forward and captain John Tavares for the award. Benn finished the 2014–15 season playing in all 82 contests with 35 goals, 52 assists and 87 points, which were all career highs. Benn was named a finalist for the Ted Lindsay Award as the most outstanding player which ultimately went to Montreal Canadiens goaltender Carey Price.

After recording a career high 41 goals along with 48 assists for a career high 89 points in all 82 games played in the 2015–16 season, Benn was named a finalist for the Hart Memorial Trophy for the first time in his career and was also a finalist the Ted Lindsay Award for the second consecutive season, which both were eventually awarded to Chicago Blackhawks forward Patrick Kane. Benn's 89 points made him the runner-up for the Art Ross Trophy only behind Kane's 106 points.

On July 15, 2016, Benn agreed to an eight-year, $76 million contract extension with Dallas that runs through the 2024–25 NHL season at an average annual value of $9.5 million. On December 8, Benn recorded his 200th NHL goal in a 5–2 win over the Nashville Predators on Predators' goaltender Pekka Rinne.

On February 27, 2020, Benn recorded his 300th NHL goal in a 4–3 loss to the Boston Bruins on Bruins' goaltender Jaroslav Halák. In the 2020 playoffs, Benn and the Stars would go all the way to the Stanley Cup Final against the Tampa Bay Lightning where the Stars would get defeated in six games.

On April 8, 2021, Benn recorded his 400th career NHL assist on a goal by Roope Hintz in a 5–1 win over the Chicago Blackhawks.

On February 6, 2023, Benn played his 1,000th NHL game. He is the second player to play all 1,000 games with the Stars, after Mike Modano. Benn finished the 2022–23 season playing all 82 games with 33 goals, 45 assists and 78 points recorded. During the 2023 playoffs in the conference finals, Benn was suspended for two games after landing on Vegas Golden Knights forward Mark Stone with his stick in game 3. He was assessed a game misconduct and ejected from the game. After missing games 4 and 5 due to the suspension, Benn returned to the lineup for game 6 of the Western Conference finals, which the Stars lost 6–0 and the series 4–2 to the eventual Stanley Cup champion Golden Knights.

==== Recent years (2023–present) ====
On December 11, 2023, Benn recorded his 500th NHL assist on a goal by Miro Heiskanen in a 6–3 win over the Detroit Red Wings. Benn would finish the 2023–24 season with 21 goals, 39 assists for 60 points in all 82 contests as the Stars as a team clinched the top seed in the Western Conference. In the 2024 playoffs, Benn and the Stars would go on another lengthy run as they would make a second consecutive conference finals and third in his career and captaincy by defeating the defending Stanley Cup champion Vegas Golden Knights in seven games in the opening round followed by a second round victory in six games over the Colorado Avalanche before getting defeated in the conference finals in six games for a second consecutive year, this time to the Edmonton Oilers. Benn finished the playoffs with four goals and 11 assists for 15 points in all 19 playoff games.

On June 26, 2025, Benn agreed to a one-year, $1 million contract extension with $3 million in potential performance bonuses that runs through the 2025–26 season. On September 25, it was announced that Benn would miss at least four weeks after suffering a collapsed lung. Benn scored the 400th NHL goal of his career off a feed from Wyatt Johnston during an 8–3 win against the Edmonton Oilers on November 25.

On July 3, 2026, Benn signed a one-year, $850,000 contract with $1,150,000 in performance bonuses with the Stars. He will receive $200,000 each for playing in 10, 20, and 40 games, along with $150,000 if the Stars qualify for the playoffs and $100,000 for each round won by the Stars.

On November 14 of the 2026–27 season, Benn recorded his 1,000th career point with a goal in the second period against the Buffalo Sabres. He became just the second Star to achieve the mark in franchise history and first since Mike Modano.

== International play ==
Jamie Benn
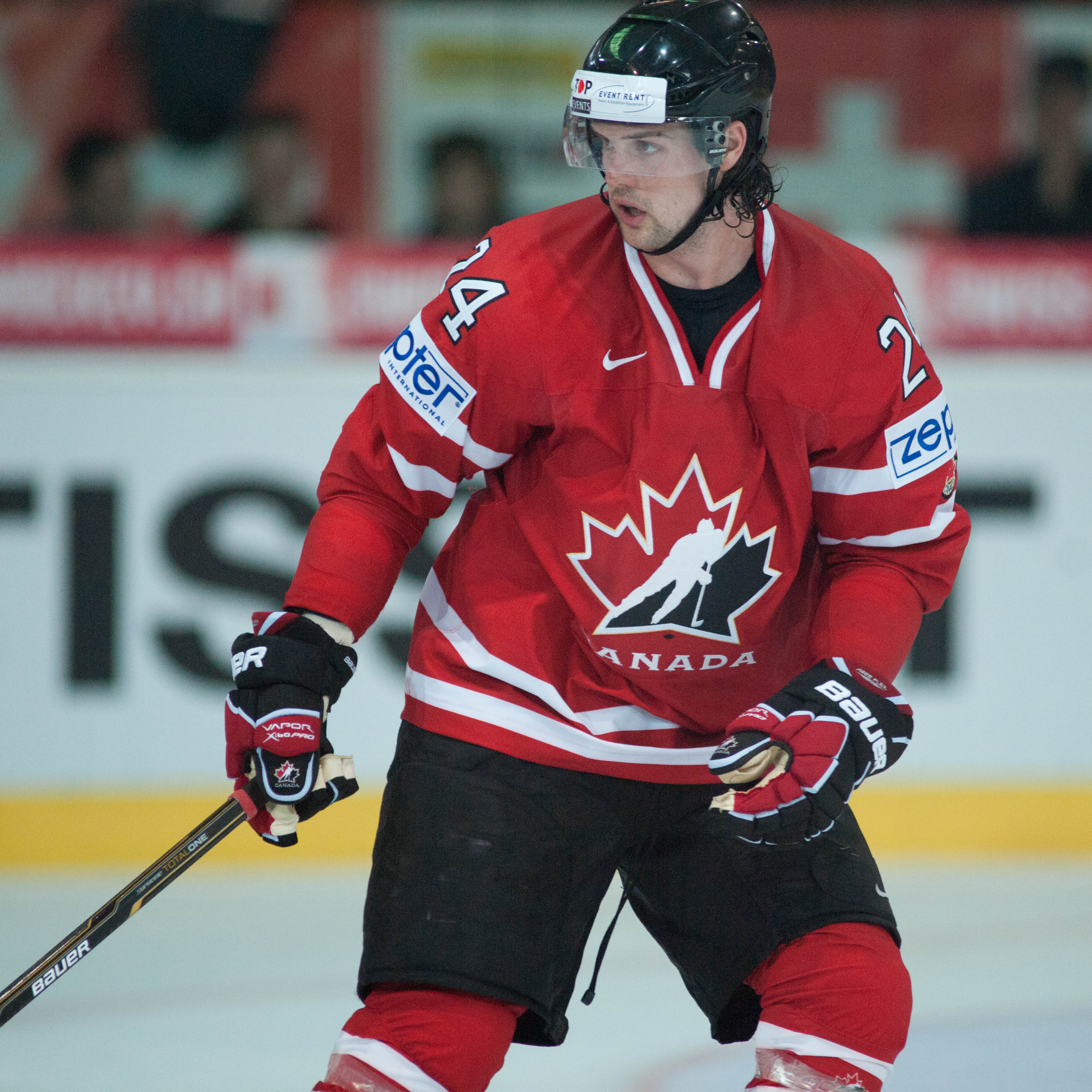
- Benn representing Canada in 2012

Medal record

Men's ice hockey

Representing Canada

Winter Olympics
Gold medal – first place	2014 Sochi	

World Junior Championships
Gold medal – first place	2009 Canada	

Playing in his second WHL season, Benn was named to Team Canada, along with Kelowna Rockets teammate Tyler Myers, for the 2009 World Junior Ice Hockey Championships in Ottawa. He contributed 4 goals and 2 assists in 6 games, helping Canada to its record-tying fifth straight gold medal, defeating Sweden 5–1 in the final. Benn first represented the senior team at the 2012 IIHF World Championship.

On January 7, 2014, Benn was named to the Canadian Olympic hockey team for the 2014 Winter Olympics in Sochi despite not being invited to the orientation camp during the summer of 2013. In his first game as an Olympian, Benn scored the game-winning goal in Canada's first game against Norway in a 3–1 victory. He scored the only goal in a 1–0 win against the United States in the semifinal, to advance Canada to the gold medal game, where they eventually beat Sweden 3–0.

== Personal life ==
Benn is the younger brother of retired NHL defenceman Jordie Benn. The brothers played alongside one another on the Stars from 2011 through 2017.

== Career statistics ==
=== Regular season and playoffs ===
Bold indicates led league

			Regular season					Playoffs
Season	Team	League	GP	G	A	Pts	PIM	GP	G	A	Pts	PIM
2004–05	Peninsula Panthers	VIJHL	4	1	2	3	2	2	0	0	0	0
2005–06	Peninsula Panthers	VIJHL	38	31	24	55	92	7	5	7	12	20
2005–06	Victoria Salsa	BCHL	6	0	0	0	0	—	—	—	—	—
2006–07	Victoria Grizzlies	BCHL	53	42	23	65	78	11	5	4	9	12
2007–08	Kelowna Rockets	WHL	51	33	32	65	68	7	3	8	11	4
2008–09	Kelowna Rockets	WHL	56	46	36	82	71	19	13	20	33	18
2009–10	Dallas Stars	NHL	82	22	19	41	45	—	—	—	—	—
2009–10	Texas Stars	AHL	—	—	—	—	—	24	14	12	26	22
2010–11	Dallas Stars	NHL	69	22	34	56	52	—	—	—	—	—
2011–12	Dallas Stars	NHL	71	26	37	63	55	—	—	—	—	—
2012–13	Hamburg Freezers	DEL	19	7	13	20	30	—	—	—	—	—
2012–13	Dallas Stars	NHL	41	12	21	33	40	—	—	—	—	—
2013–14	Dallas Stars	NHL	81	34	45	79	64	6	4	1	5	4
2014–15	Dallas Stars	NHL	82	35	52	**87**	64	—	—	—	—	—
2015–16	Dallas Stars	NHL	82	41	48	89	64	13	5	10	15	10
2016–17	Dallas Stars	NHL	77	26	43	69	66	—	—	—	—	—
2017–18	Dallas Stars	NHL	82	36	43	79	54	—	—	—	—	—
2018–19	Dallas Stars	NHL	78	27	26	53	56	13	2	8	10	10
2019–20	Dallas Stars	NHL	69	19	20	39	53	27	8	11	19	32
2020–21	Dallas Stars	NHL	52	11	24	35	33	—	—	—	—	—
2021–22	Dallas Stars	NHL	82	18	28	46	88	7	1	1	2	6
2022–23	Dallas Stars	NHL	82	33	45	78	34	17	3	8	11	51
2023–24	Dallas Stars	NHL	82	21	39	60	41	19	4	11	15	6
2024–25	Dallas Stars	NHL	80	16	33	49	70	18	1	2	3	26
2025–26	Dallas Stars	NHL	60	15	21	36	53	6	0	0	0	8
NHL totals			1,252	414	578	992	932	126	28	52	80	153

=== International ===
Year	Team	Event	Result	GP	G	A	Pts	PIM
2009	Canada	WJC	1st place, gold medalist(s)	6	4	2	6	4
2012	Canada	WC	5th	8	3	2	5	4
2014	Canada	OG	1st place, gold medalist(s)	6	2	0	2	4
Junior totals				6	4	2	6	4
Senior totals				14	5	2	7	8

== Awards and honours ==
Award	Year	Ref
CHL / WHL
West first All-Star team	2008–09	
Ed Chynoweth Trophy	2009	
Ed Chynoweth Cup champion	2008–09	
Memorial Cup All-Star team	2009	
NHL
NHL All-Star Game	2012, 2016	
NHL first All-Star team	2014, 2016	
Art Ross Trophy	2015	
NHL second All-Star team	2015	

=== Records ===
==== Dallas Stars ====
- Most career overtime goals (12)
- Longest tenured captain (13 seasons, 2013-14 to 2025-26)

Awards and achievements
Preceded by Sidney Crosby	Winner of the Art Ross Trophy; 2015	Succeeded by Patrick Kane
Sporting positions
Preceded by Brenden Morrow	Dallas Stars captain 2013–present	Incumbent
