= CCGS John P. Tully =

Offshore oceanographic science vessel

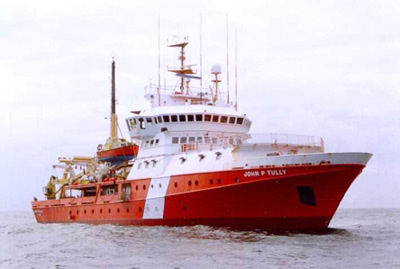
- John P. Tully

History

Canada
- Name: John P. Tully
- Namesake: John P. Tully, oceanographer
- Operator: Canadian Coast Guard
- Port of registry: Ottawa, Ontario
- Builder: Bel-Air Shipyard Limited, Vancouver, British Columbia
- Yard number: 302
- Launched: December 1984
- Commissioned: June 1985
- Recommissioned: 1995
- In service: 1985–present
- Homeport: CCG Base Patricia Bay, Sidney, British Columbia (Pacific Region)
- Identification: CG2958; IMO number: 8320420
- Status: in active service

General characteristics
- Type: Offshore oceanographic science vessel
- Tonnage: 2,021 GT; 638 DWT
- Displacement: 1,800 long tons (1,800 t)
- Length: 68.9 m (226 ft 1 in)
- Beam: 14.5 m (47 ft 7 in)
- Draught: 4.5 m (14 ft 9 in)
- Ice class: A1 (Lloyds)
- Propulsion: Diesel – 2 × Deutz 8 cyl engines; 2,757 kW (3,697 hp)
- Speed: 13.5 knots (25.0 km/h)
- Range: 12,000 nmi (22,000 km) at 10 knots (19 km/h)
- Endurance: 50 days
- Boats & landing craft carried: 1 × RHIB
- Complement: 21
- Aircraft carried: 1 × light helicopter
- Aviation facilities: 190 m^{2} (2,000 sq ft) flight deck

CCGS John P. Tully (Note: CCGS stands for Canadian Coast Guard Ship) is an offshore oceanographic science vessel in the Canadian Coast Guard operating out of Pacific Region at CGS Base Patricia Bay in Sidney, British Columbia. Prior to 1995, the ship was assigned to Fisheries and Oceans Canada. The vessel entered service in June 1985 with the Department of Fisheries and Oceans on the West Coast of Canada. In 1995, the fleets of Fisheries and Oceans and the Canadian Coast Guard were merged under Canadian Coast Guard command and John P. Tully became a Coast Guard vessel.

== Design and description ==
John P. Tully is 68.9 metres (226 ft 1 in) long overall and 61.7 metres (202 ft 5 in) long between perpendiculars with a beam of 14.5 metres (47 ft 7 in) and a draught of 4.5 metres (14 ft 9 in). The ship has a fully loaded displacement of 1,800 long tons (1,800 t) with a 2,021 gross tonnage (GT) and a deadweight tonnage (DWT) of 638. The ship has two Deutz 628 geared diesel engines powering three Caterpillar C18 generators driving one controllable-pitch propeller and stern and bow thrusters creating 2,757 kilowatts (3,697 hp). This gives the vessel a maximum speed of 13.5 knots (25.0 km/h). The ship can carry 454.70 m^{3} (100,020 imp gal) of diesel fuel and has a range of 12,000 nautical miles (22,224 km) at 10 knots (19 km/h).

The research vessel is equipped with Sperry Bridgemaster navigational radar operating on the X and S-bands. John P. Tully has a 190 m^{2} (2,045 sq ft) flight deck situated between the bow and the forward superstructure. The ship can operate one light helicopter of the MBB Bo 105 or Bell 206L types from the flight deck but is not equipped with a hangar for storage. The ship has a complement of 21, comprising 7 officers and 14 crew. There are also 20 spare berths aboard the vessel.

== Operational history ==
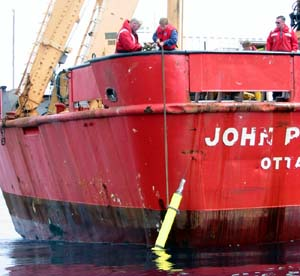
John P. Tully in 2004 on a joint research voyage with NOAA scientists

John P. Tully was constructed by Bel-Air Shipyard in Vancouver, British Columbia with the yard number 302 and was launched in December 1984. The ship was completed and entered service with the Department of Fisheries and Oceans in June 1985. In 1995 the fleets of Fisheries and Oceans and the Canadian Coast Guard were merged under Canadian Coast Guard command and John P. Tully was given the prefix CCGS. The research vessel was named for the oceanographer John P. Tully and is based at the Institute of Ocean Sciences at Sidney, British Columbia.

John P. Tully has been employed on joint research voyages with a variety of United States agencies, including the National Oceanic and Atmospheric Administration. On 25 October 2001, the research vessel responded to a distress call from the fishing vessel Kella-Lee 13 miles (21 km) north of Cape Scott, Vancouver Island. Due to a violent storm with winds reaching 80 knots (150 km/h), the Coast Guard vessel could not reach the site until the next morning. John P. Tully recovered two survivors from the four crew. In October 2016, after the tugboat Nathan E. Stewart sank near Bella Bella, British Columbia and began to leak oil, John P. Tully and CCGS Bartlett were deployed to help contain the spill.

== See also ==
- List of equipment of the Canadian Coast Guard
