= School District 63 Saanich =

School district in British Columbia, Canada

Location
- Saanichton, Vancouver Island Saanich, Central Saanich, North Saanich, Sidney Canada

District information
- Superintendent: Dave Eberwein
- Schools: 18
- Budget: CA$83.1 million

Students and staff
- Students: 6697 (Feb. 2016)

Other information
- Assistant superintendents: Paul Mckenzie
- Secretary treasurer: Jason Reid
- Directors: Carly Hunter (Director of Instruction); Monica Braniff (Director of Instruction)
- Website: www.sd63.bc.ca

School District 63 Saanich is a school district in the Canadian province of British Columbia. It covers the area north of Victoria on the Saanich Peninsula. This includes part of the District of Saanich, as well as the Municipalities of Central Saanich, North Saanich, and the township Sidney. Saanich offers a variety of programs including an international student program and continuing education.

== History ==
The history of the Saanich School District predates the province of British Columbia. The first Saanich School District was formed on June 25, 1869, while the area was still part of the Colony of Vancouver Island.

== Schools ==
School	Location	Grades	Website
Bayside Middle School	Brentwood Bay	6-8	http://bayside.sd63.bc.ca/
Brentwood Elementary School	Brentwood Bay	K-5	http://brentwood.sd63.bc.ca/
Claremont Secondary School	Saanich	9-12	http://claremont.sd63.bc.ca/
Cordova Bay Elementary School	Saanich	K-5	http://cordovabay.sd63.bc.ca/
Deep Cove Elementary School	North Saanich	K-5	http://deepcove.sd63.bc.ca/
Keating Elementary School	Saanichton	K-5	http://keating.sd63.bc.ca/
KELSET Elementary School	North Saanich	K-5	http://kelset.sd63.bc.ca/
Lochside Elementary School	Saanich	K-5	http://lochside.sd63.bc.ca/
North Saanich Middle School	Sidney	6-8	http://northsaanich.sd63.bc.ca/
Parkland Secondary School	Sidney	9-12	http://parkland.sd63.bc.ca/
Prospect Lake Elementary School	Saanich	K-5	http://prospectlake.sd63.bc.ca/
Royal Oak Middle School	Saanich	6-8	http://royaloak.sd63.bc.ca/
Saanich International Student Program	Sidney	K-12	http://sisp.sd63.bc.ca/
SD 63 Alternate Learning Program	Saanich	6-8	https://www.sd63.bc.ca/programs/cdc-services
SD 63 Childhood Development Centre	Saanich	K-5	https://www.sd63.bc.ca/programs/cdc-services
SD 63 Individual Learning Centre	Saanichton, Broadmead	9-12	http://ilc.sd63.bc.ca/
Sidney Elementary School	Sidney	K-5	http://sidney.sd63.bc.ca/
South Island Distance Education School	Saanich	K-12	http://www.sides.ca/en.html
Stelly's Secondary School	Saanichton	9-12	http://stellys.sd63.bc.ca/

== See also ==
- List of school districts in British Columbia
