= Narasaki Senpakukogyo Limited =

Narasaki Senpakukogyo Limited or Narasaki Shipbuilding or Narasaki Zosen is a small shipbuilder located in Muroran, Hokkaidō, Japan. It was part of the Narasaki Sangyo Company Limited. Although still building vessels, the company is now focused on other product lines.

== History ==
Narasaki Shipbuilding began with the establishment of the Tsukiji Shipyard in Muroran in 1935 and became Narasaki Shipbuilding Corporation in 1961. The shipyard is located in the inner harbour of Muroran.

Narasaki was a small shipbuilder which built mostly yachts and smaller vessels. It is now still a vessel manufacturer, but also performs repairs to existing ships.

== Diversification ==
Beginning in the late 1960s Narasaki diversified beyond shipbuilding into other products:

- waste water purification equipment - land and shipboard
- bridge construction - via Yokogawa Bridge Corporation
- machinery - made from steel
- iron pipes manufacturing

The need for diversification became more apparent in the 1980s when smaller shipbuilders in Japan began to disappear due to competition from larger domestic and overseas firms.

== Sale of Narasaki Shipbuilding ==
In 2008 the Narasaki Shipyard was acquired by Hakodate Dock Company Limited, a subsidiary of Namura Shipbuilding Company Limited.

== Ships built by Narasaki ==
- Roll on/off - lift on/off cargo vessel
- large private yachts - especially in the mid to late 1970s
- fisheries patrol vessels - CCGS W. E. Ricker for the Canadian Coast Guard
- research vessels
- sports fishing vessels
