= South Island Distance Education School =

Location
- 4574 Wilkinson Rd. Victoria, British Columbia, V8Z 7E8; Canada; 48.4969°N 123.3944°W

Information
- School type: Public, Distributed Learning
- Founded: 1988
- School board: School District 63 Saanich
- Superintendent: Dave Eberwein
- Principal: Sean Hayes
- Staff: 60
- Grades: K-12
- Enrollment: 3500 (January 2018)
- Website: sides.ca
- Last updated: August 10, 2016

South Island Distance Education School (SIDES) is a public, full-service, K-12 school, offering distributed learning courses to all students in British Columbia and is a member of School District 63 Saanich.

SIDES has over 3,500 students currently enrolled, from ages five to eighteen. About 20% of these students call SIDES their "school of record," meaning that they take most or all of their courses through the Distributed Learning program. SIDES's

Kindergarten to Grade 9 programs include the parents as an important part of the students' educational experience. Parents or other designated adults serve as "home facilitators" and partner with the SIDES teachers to deliver and support student learning.

SIDES's secondary program (Grades 10 - 12) is recognized as the equivalent of programs offered in neighborhood schools, with graduates attending post-secondary institutions throughout North America.

Adults who are residents of British Columbia and who have not yet graduated are eligible to complete their graduation requirements at SIDES (or any BC public school) free of tuition charges. Adults who are residents of British Columbia and who have already graduated from secondary school may take courses at SIDES to upgrade, however they are required to pay tuition fees if they choose to attend public secondary schools for this upgrading. If students are ordinarily residents of British Columbia, but are traveling or living abroad temporarily, they may take courses from anywhere in the world.

== History ==
SIDES was established in 1988 as one of nine regional public "distance education" schools in British Columbia. At the time, the SIDES program was a paper-based program in which students worked in paper workbooks, sending assignments to the school via mail to be evaluated by teachers (known as "markers"). The program served students from grades K - 12 and worked with students only from the southern half of Vancouver Island and the nearby Gulf Islands.

Today, the program is almost entirely online (with some print resources). Students may join the school from anywhere in the province.
