= CCGS Provo Wallis =

History

Canada
- Name: Provo Wallis
- Namesake: Provo Wallis
- Owner: Government of Canada
- Operator: Canadian Coast Guard
- Port of registry: Ottawa
- Builder: Marine Industries, Sorel
- Yard number: 387
- Commissioned: October 1969
- Decommissioned: 2011
- Refit: 1990
- Stricken: 2011
- Home port: CCG Base Saint John, NB (Maritime Region)
- Identification: CGDP; IMO number: 7006766
- Status: Decommissioned

General characteristics
- Class & type: Provo Wallis-class buoy tender
- Tonnage: 1,313 GRT; 581 NT
- Length: 57.7 m (189 ft 4 in)
- Beam: 13 m (42 ft 8 in)
- Draught: 3.7 m (12 ft 2 in)
- Installed power: 2,100 bhp (1,600 kW)
- Propulsion: 2 × National Gas 6-cylinder diesel engines
- Speed: 12 knots (22 km/h)
- Range: 3,000 nautical miles (5,556 km) at 11 knots (20 km/h)
- Endurance: 20 days
- Complement: 24

CCGS Provo Wallis (Note: CCGS stands for Canadian Coast Guard Ship) is a Provo Wallis-class buoy tender that served with the Canadian Coast Guard. The vessel entered service in 1969 and was classed as a Medium-endurance Multi-tasked Vessel. Provo Wallis spent the majority of her career on the Atlantic Coast of Canada before transferring to the West Coast. Ice-strengthened, the ship was used mainly for maintaining navaids in shipping lanes. The vessel was taken out of service in 2011 and laid up.

== Design and description ==
The lead ship of the class, Provo Wallis and her sister ship, CCGS Bartlett, were initially 57.7 metres (189 ft 4 in) long overall with a 13 metres (42 ft 8 in) beam and a draught of 4.1 metres (13 ft 5 in). Provo Wallis had an initial gross register tonnage (GRT) of 1,317. The ship was initially powered by two National Gas 6-cylinder geared diesel engines driving two controllable-pitch propellers, creating 2,100 brake horsepower (1,600 kW). This gave the vessel a maximum speed of 12 knots (22 km/h). The ship carried 240.00 m^{3} (52,790 imp gal) of diesel fuel giving Provo Wallis a range of 3,000 nautical miles (5,600 km) at 11 knots (20 km/h) and the vessel could stay at sea for up to 20 days.

In 1990 Provo Wallis underwent a modernization refit that altered her dimensions giving the ship a new length of 63.9 metres (209 ft 8 in) and her draught decreased to 3.7 metres (12 ft 2 in). The vessel's was remeasured to 1,462 gross tonnage (GT). Other changes during the modernization were the installation of new equipment and improving accommodation. The buoy tender had a complement of 24.

== Service history ==
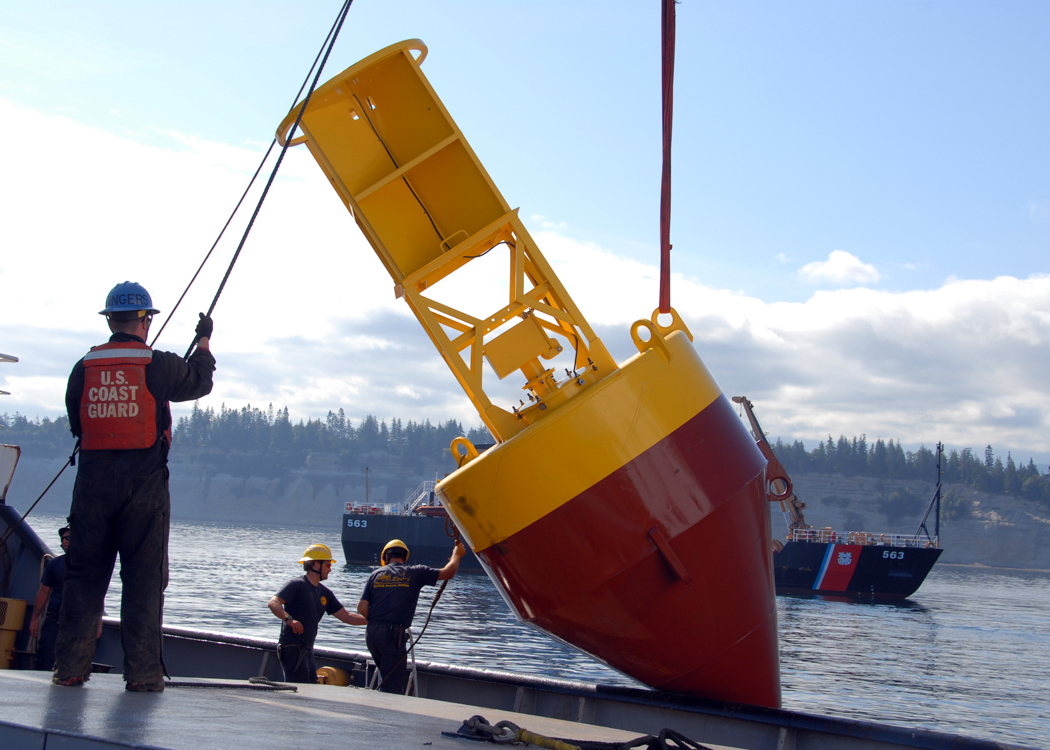
A buoy being placed into the water by Provo Wallis

The ship was constructed by Marine Industries at their yard in Sorel, Quebec and was commissioned in October 1969. The ship was named in honour of Provo Wallis, a native of Halifax, Nova Scotia. Wallis was appointed Admiral of the fleet in the Royal Navy on 11 December 1877; the highest rank in the Royal Navy. The ship was registered in Ottawa, Ontario. The homeport of Provo Wallis was CCG Base Saint John in Saint John, New Brunswick.

In 1990, the vessel underwent a major refit at Marystown Shipyard in Marystown, Newfoundland and Labrador a new derrick installed, and other modernizations. In 2003 CCGS Provo Wallis was placed in cold lay-up/mothballed at CCG Base Dartmouth but was reactivated in 2006 and sailed to British Columbia where she replaced her sister ship Bartlett which was placed in cold lay-up until refit in 2010.

Upon completion of the refit for CCGS Bartlett in 2010, CCGS Provo Wallis was declared surplus and decommissioned. The ship was renamed 2011-02 by the Department of Fisheries and Oceans and was listed for sale in 2013. The ship was purchased by J. Beaulieu in 2013.

== Sources ==
- Maginley, Charles D. & Collin, Bernard (2001). The Ships of Canada's Marine Services. St. Catharines, Ontario: Vanwell Publishing Limited. ISBN 1-55125-070-5.
- "Provo Wallis (7006766)". Miramar Ship Index.
- Saunders, Stephen, ed. (2004). Jane's Fighting Ships 2004–2005. Alexandria, Virginia: Jane's Information Group. ISBN 0-7106-2623-1.
