= Sidney Museum =

Local history museum in British Columbia, Canada

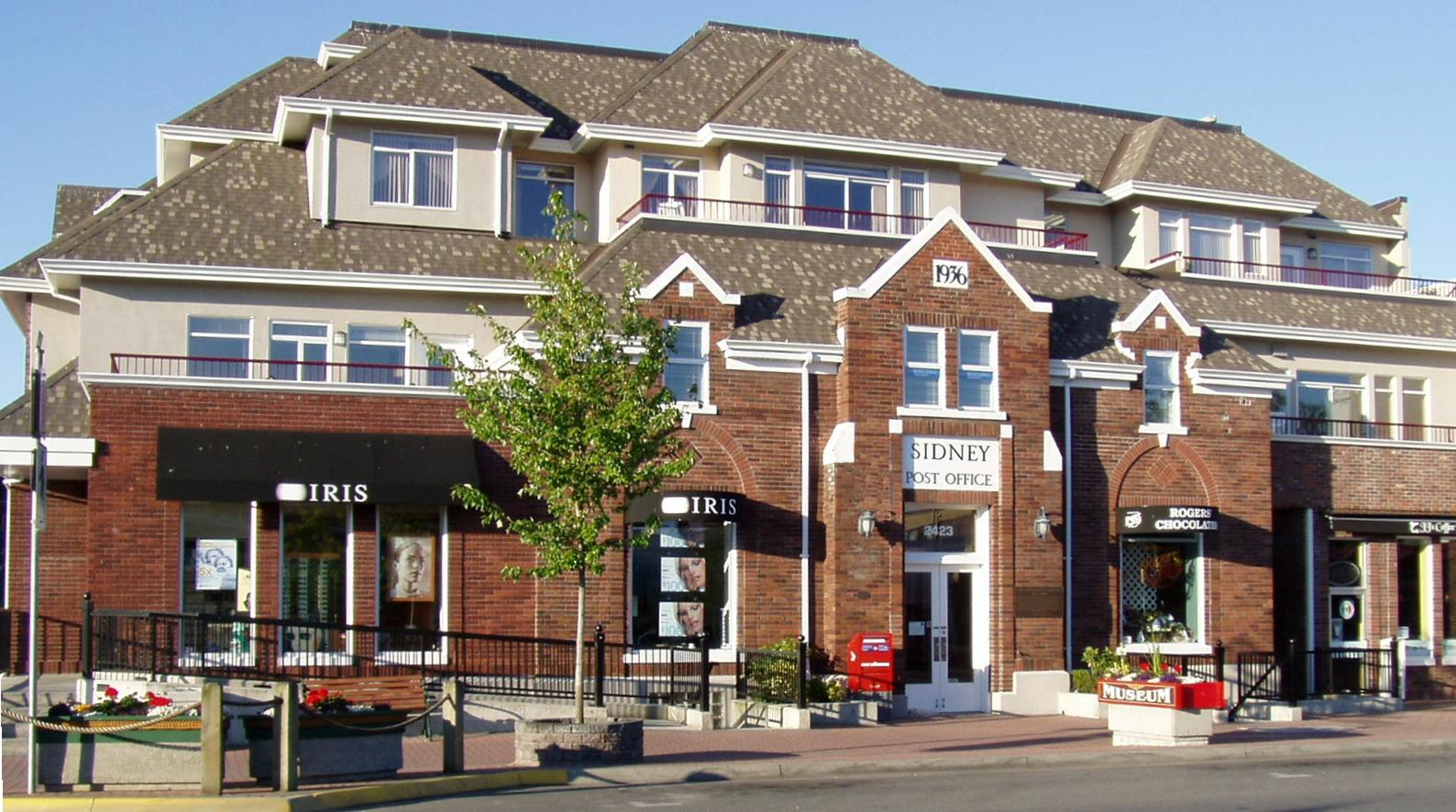
- The Historical Post Office Building, Home of the Sidney Museum
- Established: 1971
- Location: Sidney, British Columbia, Canada.
- Coordinates: 48.6487°N 123.3993°W
- Type: Local history museum
- Website: www.sidneymuseum.ca/

The Sidney Museum and Archives is a non-profit community organization located in Sidney, British Columbia, Canada, which is dedicated to the history of Sidney and North Saanich. Run by the Society of Saanich Peninsula Museums, the museum promotes awareness of local heritage through exhibits, programs, and collections. Its permanent collection consists of over 6000 items. In addition to its permanent exhibits, the museum also has rotating temporary exhibits.

== Exhibits ==
The focus of the permanent displays in the Sidney Museum is the human history of Sidney and the North Saanich Peninsula. This includes the First Nations groups of the Peninsula, the settler families of the area, economic ventures and development throughout the past century, the beginnings of the railway and transportation systems in the area, the development of the Town of Sidney, the effect of the World Wars on the residents, and the establishment of ferry links between Sidney and the surrounding islands.

The collection includes a reproduction of Critchley's Store (in operation in Sidney between 1899 and 1930s), a reproduction vintage kitchen, models of and artifacts from the SS Iroquois, and artifacts from local businesses including the Sidney Mill, Saanich Cannery, and the Victoria & Sidney (V&S) railroad.

Emphasis is placed on how artifacts were used and what day-to-day life consisted of throughout the history of Sidney and North Saanich.

== Exhibit Gallery ==
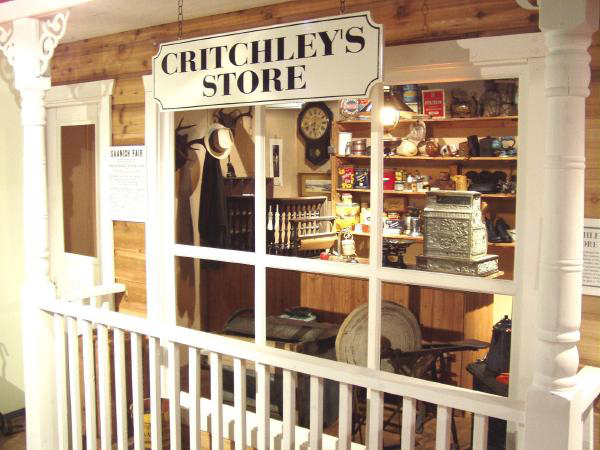
Re-creation of Critchley's General Store

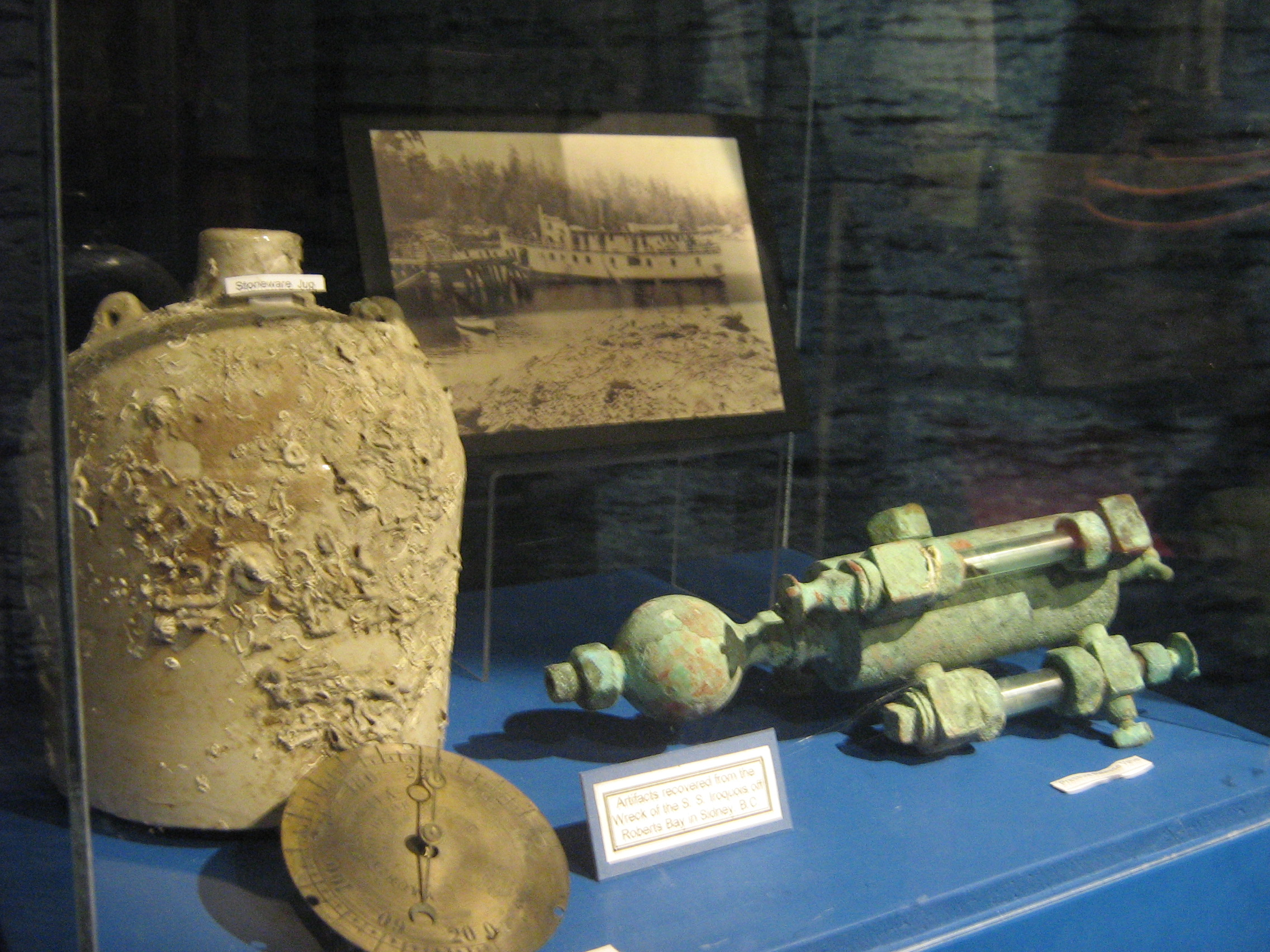
Artifacts from the sunken SS Iroquois

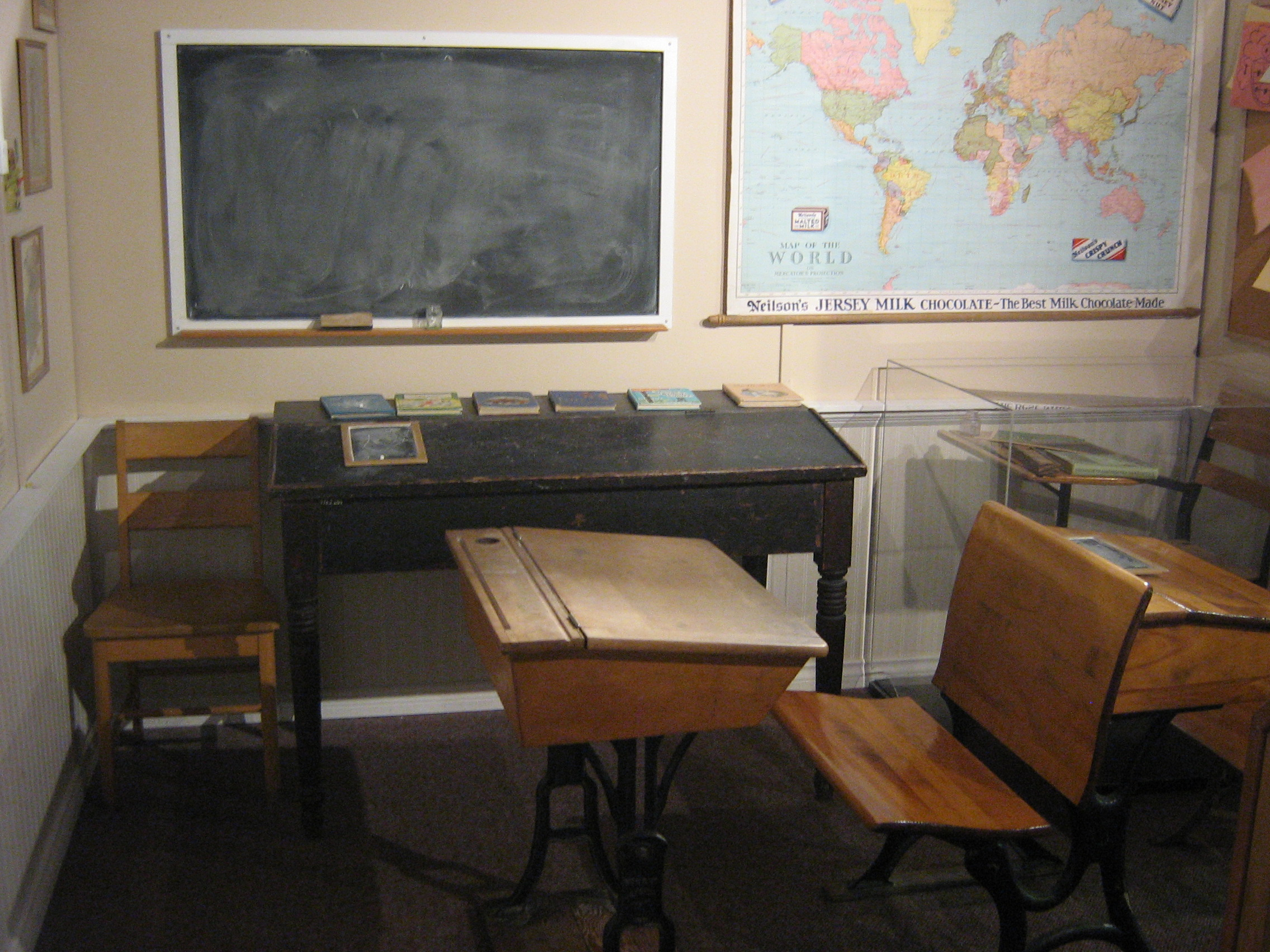
A mid-century School Room Display

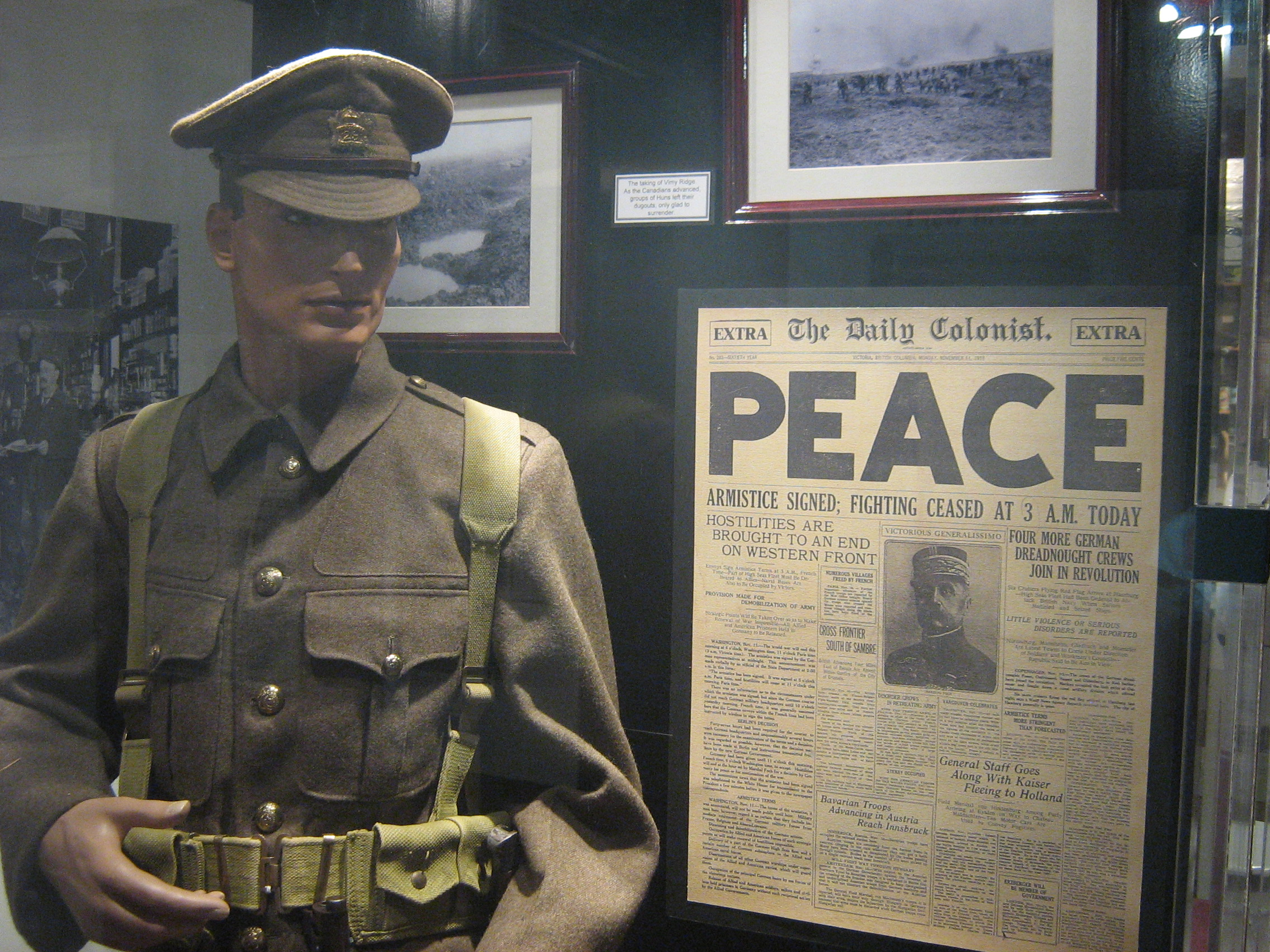
Part of the First World War Exhibit, Sidney Museum

== Archives ==
The Sidney Archives operates as a department of the museum and offers research by appointment. Holding mainly textual documents and photographs, the Archives contains material specifically related to the history of Sidney and North Saanich. This includes holdings of “The Review,” the local newspaper, from between 1912 and 1989, an extensive photograph collection from the Sidney Experimental Farm, and Sidney Municipal records. The collection is focused mainly between 1910 and 1980, though the scope of the collection ranges from between 1850 and the present day. The Archives also contains a small library of published material, a collection of oral history transcriptions, and information about heritage properties in the area.
