= Institute of Ocean Sciences =

Marine research centre in British Columbia, Canada

Coordinates: 48°39′00″N 123°26′53″W

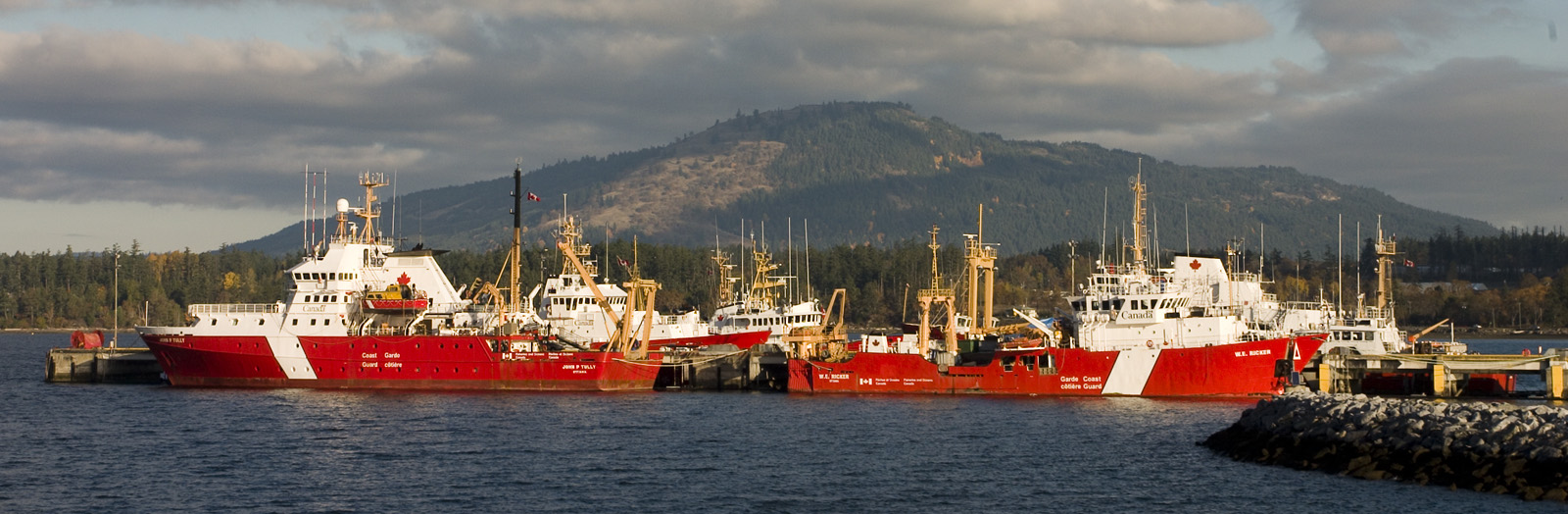
Canadian Coast Guard ships John P. Tully and W. E. Ricker docked at Institute of Ocean Sciences

The Institute of Ocean Sciences is operated by Fisheries and Oceans Canada and is one of the largest marine research centres in Canada. It is located on Patricia Bay and the former British Columbia Highway 17A in Sidney, British Columbia on Vancouver Island just west of Victoria International Airport.

The institute is paired with a Canadian Coast Guard base, and makes use of the ships CCGS John P. Tully and CCGS Sir Wilfrid Laurier as well as the Japanese RV Mirai.
