= Claremont Secondary School =

Location
- 4980 Wesley Rd; Saanich, British Columbia, V8Y 1J7; Canada; 48.516°N 123.3748°W

Information
- School type: Public, high school
- Established: September 1, 1962
- School board: School District 63 Saanich
- Principal: Ryan Brawn
- Grades: 9-12
- Enrollment: 1150 (approx.)
- Language: English
- Colours: Red & White
- Team name: Spartans
- Website: claremont.sd63.bc.ca

Claremont Secondary School (CSS) is a public secondary school in Saanich, a municipality of Greater Victoria, British Columbia, Canada. It is operated by School District 63 Saanich. CSS is one of three secondary schools in the school district and the one serving the southern end of the Saanich Peninsula. It is fed from Royal Oak Middle School and is an active participant in the Saanich International Student Program (SISP), with over 100 international students from nine countries enrolled at CSS for the 2013-14 school year.

CSS offers a variety of special academic programs, including: study/work programs in Quebec and France; a literary and creative writing environment; foreign languages with a focus on French and Spanish; Advanced Placement courses in sciences, liberal arts, and mathematics; and post secondary credit courses in accounting, criminology, and secondary school apprenticeships; and specialty and performing arts.

== Programs of Choice ==
The school offers several Programs of Choice (POC) for students:

=== Institute of Global Solutions ===
The IGS offers a project-based curriculum focusing on environmental and humanitarian challenges of the 21st century, including poverty reduction, food production, urbanization, and sustainable energy. The program is open to students from around the world. It includes local field studies and an overseas field trip for Grade 12 students.

=== Pursuit of Excellence ===
The PEP's focus is participation in the Duke of Edinburgh's Award program, which includes four components: volunteering, skills, physical, expedition. There are three levels (Gold, Silver, Bronze); all students in the PEP are required to complete the Bronze Level before graduation.

=== Programs of Choice in Athletics ===
In addition to the standard athletics program that includes tennis and boys' rugby, POC in Athletics include rowing (at nearby Elk Lake), lacrosse, golf and aquatics.

== Fine arts ==
The following performing arts programs are offered:

- Visual Art
- Drama
- Music
- Musical Theatre
- Dance
- Film and Television
- Stagecraft
- Robotics

The primary venue is the on-site Ridge Playhouse.

== Facilities ==
The building was originally constructed in 1961 but was not completed in time for the 1961-62 school year, so during its first year Claremont operated during the afternoons in Royal Oak Middle School. Significant additions and upgrades were undertaken in 1966, 1975, and 1994. The school was scheduled to undergo upgrades in 2009. The school is home to the Ridge Playhouse, a school district-owned theatre where students showcase their talent for paying public audiences. The theatre also hosts meetings and productions by community groups.

== The Claremont Review ==
The Claremont Review (CR; not to be confused with the Claremont Review of Books) is a magazine that showcases young adult writers, aged 13–19. It publishes poetry, fiction, drama and art, in two editions per year. It was founded in 1992 by volunteer co-editors who were teachers at Claremont Secondary School. The CR accepts submissions from anywhere in the English-speaking world. As of 2013 CR has published writers from every Canadian province, multiple U.S. states, Europe, Asia, Australia, and Africa. The CR receives support from private and public agencies and groups. In 1999 it was voted "Literary Magazine of the Year" by Write Magazine.

== Notable alumni ==
- Sarah Kaufman — professional Mixed Martial Artist, formerly competing with the UFC, current Invicta FC Bantamweight Champion
- Ryan Cochrane — Olympic swimming medalist
- Chelsea Green — professional wrestler actively competing in WWE
- Jess McLeod — actor
- Calum Worthy — notable Disney Channel actor.
- Emily Lowan — leader of the BC Greens and first Generation Z leader of a major political party in Canadian history
