= CCGS Bartlett =

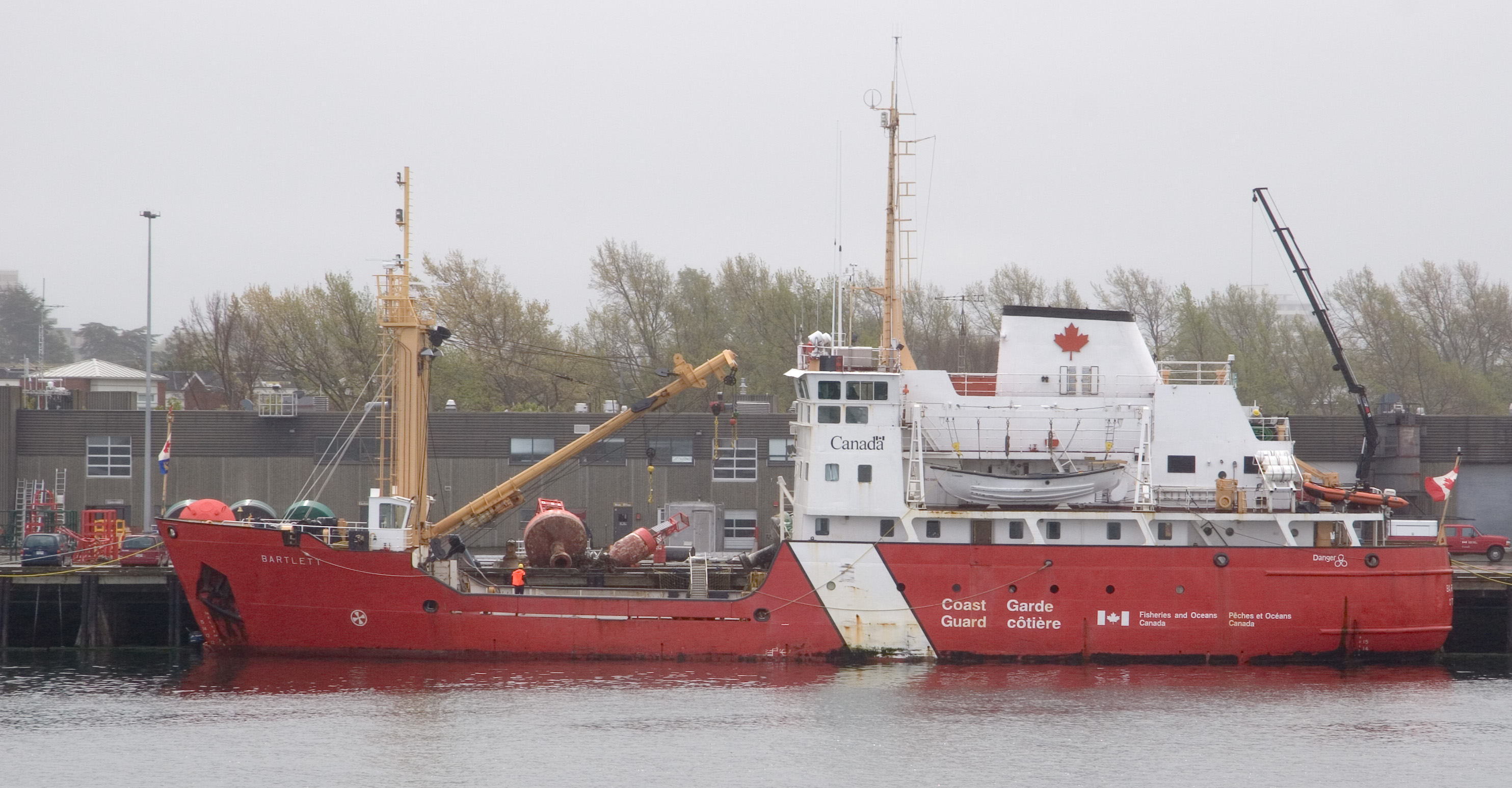
- CCGS Bartlett seen in 2006

History

Canada
- Name: Bartlett
- Namesake: Robert Bartlett
- Owner: Government of Canada
- Operator: Canadian Coast Guard
- Port of registry: Ottawa
- Builder: Marine Industries, Sorel
- Yard number: 388
- Commissioned: December 1969
- Decommissioned: 2021
- Refit: 1988
- Home port: CCG Base Victoria (Pacific Region)
- Identification: CGDR; IMO number: 7006778
- Fate: Scrapped in 2025

General characteristics
- Class & type: Provo Wallis-class buoy tender
- Tonnage: 1,317 GRT; 491 NT
- Displacement: 1,620 long tons (1,650 t)
- Length: 57.7 m (189 ft 4 in)
- Beam: 13 m (42 ft 8 in)
- Draught: 4.1 m (13 ft 5 in)
- Installed power: 2,100 bhp (1,600 kW)
- Propulsion: 2 × Mirrlees National KLSDM6 diesel engines
- Speed: 12.5 knots (23.2 km/h)
- Range: 3,300 nautical miles (6,112 km) at 11 knots (20 km/h)
- Endurance: 21 days
- Complement: 24

CCGS Bartlett (Note: CCGS stands for Canadian Coast Guard Ship) was a Provo Wallis-class buoy tender formerly operated by the Canadian Coast Guard. The vessel entered service in 1969 and was modernized in 1988. In 1982, the ship commanded the recovery efforts following the Ocean Ranger sinking off the coast of Newfoundland. The vessel was assigned to the Pacific Region and was based at Victoria, British Columbia, in the latter half of her career. The ship was taken out of service in 2021. The ship was broken up for scrap in 2025 at Esquimalt, British Columbia.

== Design and description ==
Bartlett was the second ship of the Provo Wallis-class buoy tenders and was tasked with monitoring navigational aids along the West Coast of Canada. Her twin vessel, CCGS Provo Wallis was modified after undergoing a refit in 1990 that saw her hull lengthened by 6 metres (20 ft) as well as improved equipment and accommodation. Bartlett was 57.7 m (189 ft 4 in) long overall with a beam of 13 m (42 ft 8 in) and a draught of 4.1 m (13 ft 5 in). The ship had a fully loaded displacement of 1,620 long tons (1,650 t) and has a gross register tonnage (GRT) of 1,317 and a 491 net tonnage (NT).

The buoy tender was propelled by two controllable pitch propellers powered by two Mirrlees National KLSDM6 geared diesel engines creating 1,566 kW (2,100 hp). This gave Bartlett a maximum speed of 12.5 knots (23.2 km/h). The vessel could carry 213.10 m^{3} (46,880 imp gal; 56,300 US gal) of diesel fuel and had a range of 3,300 nautical miles (6,112 km) at a cruising speed of 11 knots (20 km/h). The vessel was ice-strengthened and carried a complement of 24, with 9 officers and 15 crew in Canadian Coast Guard service. The vessel had 11 spare berths.

== Service history ==
The buoy tender was constructed by Marine Industries at their yard in Sorel, Quebec with the yard number 388. The vessel was completed in December 1969 and entered service with the Canadian Coast Guard. Bartlett is named after Captain Robert Bartlett who made over 40 expeditions to the Arctic. The vessel was initially assigned to serve in the Newfoundland and Great Lakes regions before transferring to the West Coast. The vessel was based at Victoria, British Columbia.

On 15 February 1982, the mobile offshore drilling unit Ocean Ranger capsized and sank in bad weather 165 miles (266 km) east of Newfoundland in the worst naval disaster in Canadian waters since World War II. Bartlett was among the vessels sent to the site and directed the surface search for the crew. Only debris, life rafts and the bodies of 22 of the 84 crew of Ocean Ranger were recovered. Bartlett was modernized in 1988 at Halifax Shipyards, Halifax, Nova Scotia which saw new propulsion and navigation equipment installed.

The ship underwent a $16.9 million vessel-life extension at the Allied Shipbuilders yard in North Vancouver in 2010. The refit extended the buoy tender's life by ten years, revamping the vessel's electric systems. In October 2016, after the tugboat Nathan E. Stewart sank near Bella Bella, British Columbia and began to leak oil, John P. Tully and Bartlett were deployed to help contain the spill. The ship was taken out of service in 2021. In 2025, the vessel was taken to Esquimalt Graving Dock in Esquimalt, British Columbia, and broken up for scrap by the Marine Recycling Corporation.
