= Stelly's Secondary School =

Location
- 1627 Stellys Cross Rd. Saanichton, British Columbia, V8M 1S8; Canada; 48.5797°N 123.4315°W

Information
- School type: Public, High School
- Motto: The People Place
- School board: School District 63 (Saanich)
- School number: 6363020
- Principal: Mr. Sean Hayes
- Staff: 90
- Grades: 9-12
- Enrollment: 1,016 (2011)
- Language: English, French, SENĆOŦEN, Spanish
- Colours: Maroon and Gold
- Mascot: Stinger
- Team name: Stelly's Stingers (male / female), Stelly's Queen Bees (female rugby team)
- Website: stellys.saanichschools.ca

Stelly's Secondary School is a public secondary school in Saanichton, British Columbia. It is located in School District 63 Saanich and teaches students in grades 9–12. Stelly's offers a wide range of academic classes and programs, as well as athletics programs and extra curricular clubs.

Stelly's is known around the area for its community outreach efforts, as outlined in the Maclean's magazine article titled Canada's Best High Schools. The school is also home to The Boulders Climbing Gym.

== History ==
The first principal was Lyle Garroway (1977–1994). Garroway was followed by Mike McKay (1994–1998), Bob Lee (1998–2005), Bruce Frith (2005–2011), Peter Westhaver (2011–2016), Sally Hansen (2016–2021), Melanie Paas (2022–2025) and Sean Hayes (2025–present).

== Academics and programs ==
Beyond the regular academic offerings, students can enroll in University Placement Social Studies, Advanced Placement Computer Science and English Literature, Global Perspectives, Leadership, Outdoor Pursuits, Textiles, Musical Theatre, Concert Band, Jazz Band, Choir, Vocal Jazz, French Immersion, and a wide range of apprenticeship programs.

Stelly's offers a French immersion program in which students can enroll in order to obtain a Dual Dogwood diploma.

=== Heart of the Arts ===
The Heart of the Arts program allows Grade 12 students to enrich their education in the fine and performing arts. Those enrolled gain the opportunity to work with professionals in the field of fine arts and participate in a number of workshops led by artists and performers. Students are required to have a minimum of 34 credits from various fine or performing arts courses in order to enroll.

== Athletics ==
Athletics and sports programs include, but are not limited to, badminton, basketball, climbing, ultimate, cross country, golf, rowing, rugby, soccer, swimming, tennis, track and field, and volleyball.

== Clubs ==
Clubs include Social Justice, GSA, Chess Club, Book Club, Model UN, DnD, Paddling.

== The Boulders ==
Known as "The Boulders", the Boulders Climbing Gym is operated by a not-for-profit society that has been supporting youth and disability programs since 2005. The facility includes 60 ft (18 m) overhung walls and a 15 m (49 ft) official speed wall, both approved for competition. It is one of two facilities in North America capable of hosting the IFSC International Federation of Sport Climbing's World Youth Championship, which was held at The Boulders in August 2013. Over 90 participants in after-school programs make use of the gym, as does the public and Stelly's 50-member student climbing academy.

== Notable alumni ==
- Kevin Light, a rower
- Jamie Benn, hockey player, Captain of the Dallas Stars
- Jordie Benn, hockey player
- Mike Stringer, guitarist of Spiritbox
