= Patricia Bay =

Bay in British Columbia, Canada

Coordinates: 48°39′N 123°28′W

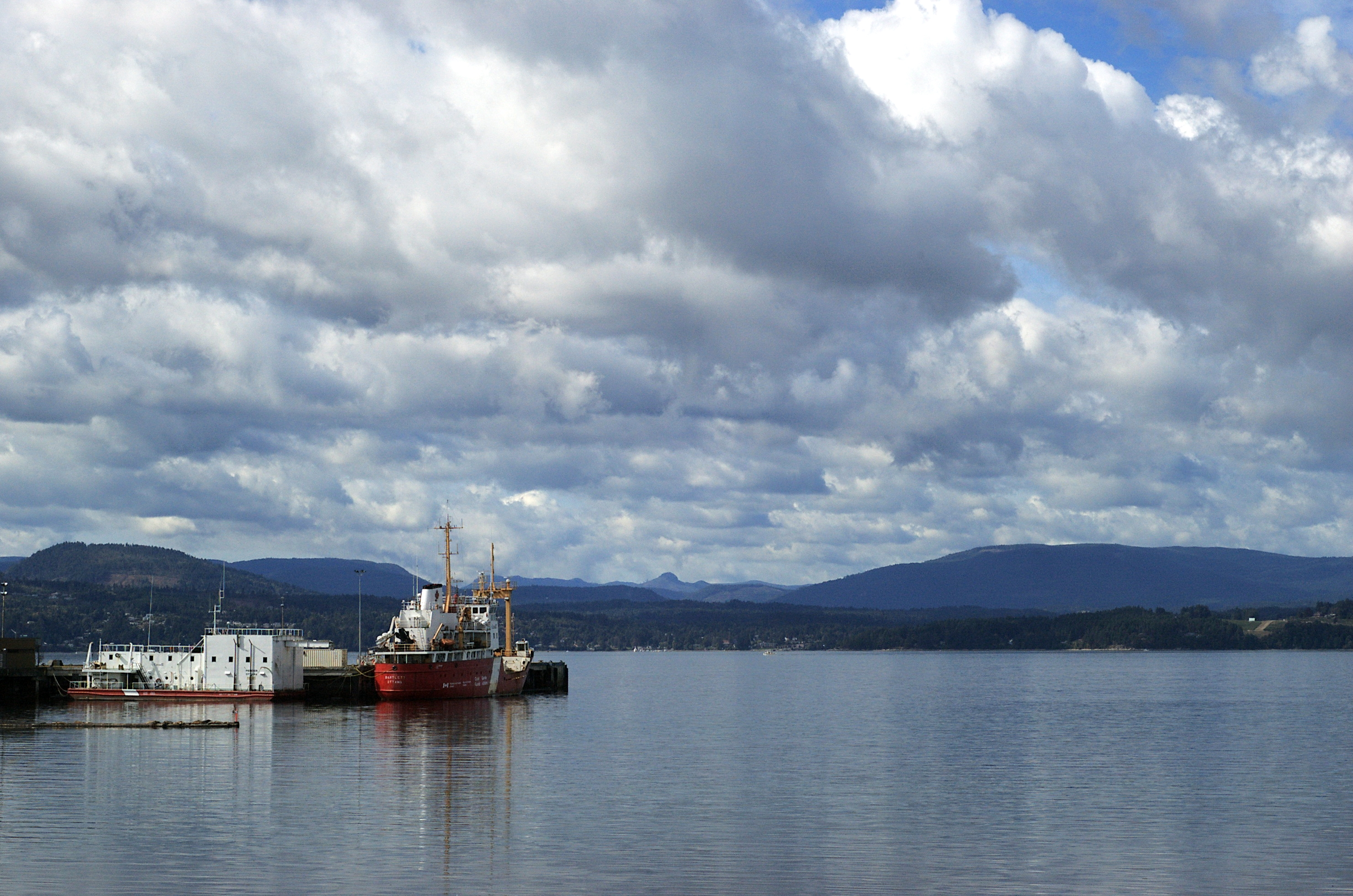
CCGS Bartlett moored in Patricia Bay, 21 September 2006 at 12:30

Patricia Bay ("Pat Bay" to locals) is a body of salt water that extends east from Saanich Inlet and forms part of the shoreline of North Saanich, British Columbia. It lies due west of Victoria International Airport. A municipal park covers most of its eastern shore except at the southern end, which is home to a Canadian Coast Guard base, a seaplane port known as Victoria Airport Water Aerodrome, and two Canadian Government research facilities: the Institute of Ocean Sciences and GSC Pacific Sidney (formerly the Pacific Geoscience Centre).

== History ==
Patricia Bay was named after Princess Patricia of Connaught, daughter of the Duke of Connaught, Governor-General, who laid the cornerstone of the Connaught Wing (houses the Legislative Library) of the Parliament Buildings on 28 September 1912.

In the 1900s, there was a train track that connected Sidney and Victoria. The Canadian National Railway controlled the track but later abandoned it in 1931. The track was moved south.

== See also ==
- Institute of Ocean Sciences
- Victoria and Sidney Railway
- Victoria Airport Water Aerodrome
- Victoria International Airport
- Royal eponyms in Canada
