= Sidney, British Columbia =

Town in British Columbia, Canada

Sidney
- Town
- Town of Sidney
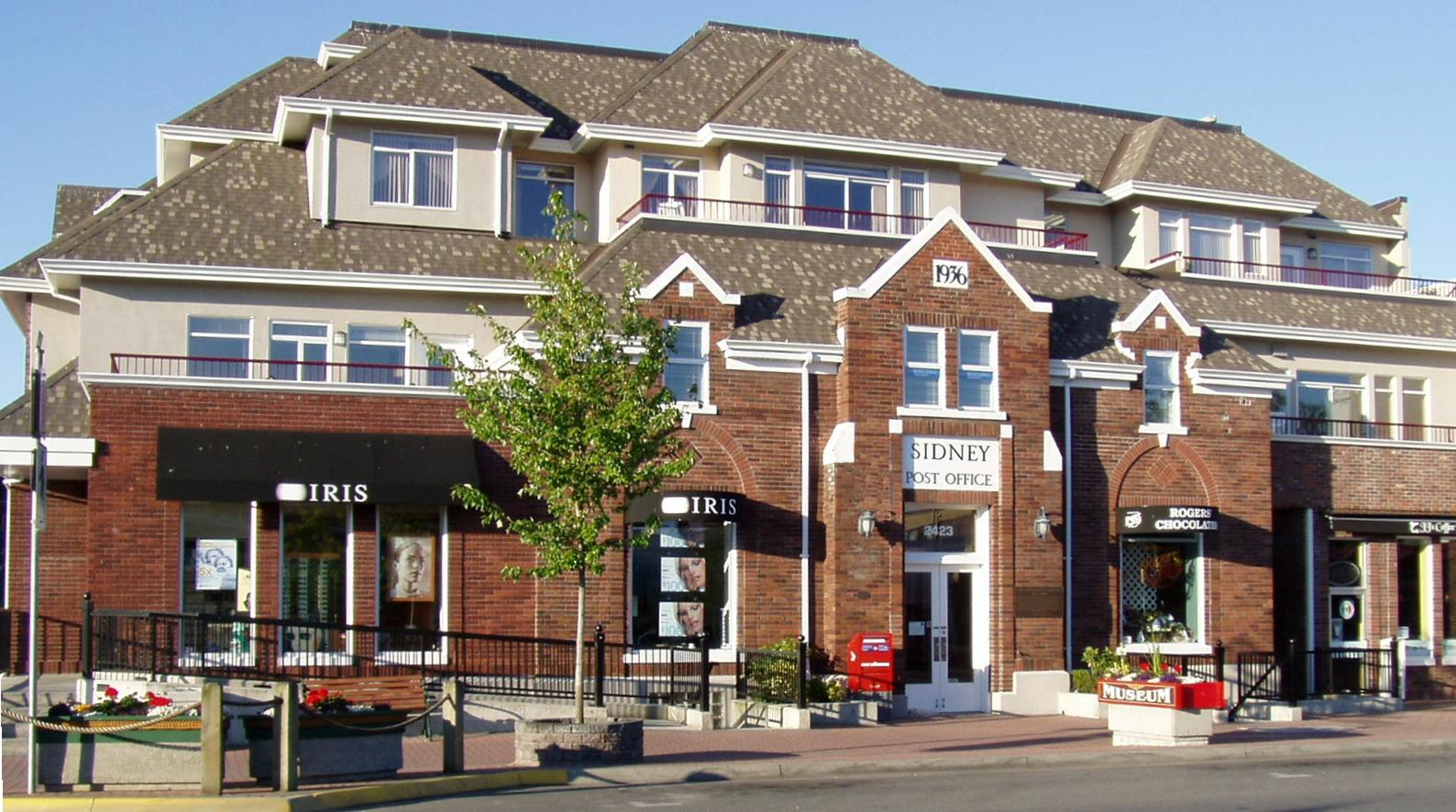
- Sidney Post Office

- Location of Sidney within the Capital Regional District

- Location of Town of Sidney within the Capital District in British Columbia, Canada Sidney (British Columbia)
- Coordinates: 48°39′2″N 123°23′55″W
- Country: Canada
- Province: British Columbia
- Regional district: Capital
- Incorporated: 1952

Government
  - Governing body: Sidney Town Council
  - Mayor: Peter Wainwright
  - MP: Elizabeth May (Green)
  - MLA: Emily Lowan (Green)

Area
  - Total: 5.10 km^{2} (1.97 sq mi)
- Elevation: 5 m (16 ft)

Population (2016)
  - Total: 11,672
  - Density: 2,280.7/km^{2} (5,907/sq mi)
- Time zone: UTC−07:00 (PT)
- Forward sortation area: V8L
- Area codes: 250, 778
- Highways: 17
- Waterways: Haro Strait
- Website: www.sidney.ca

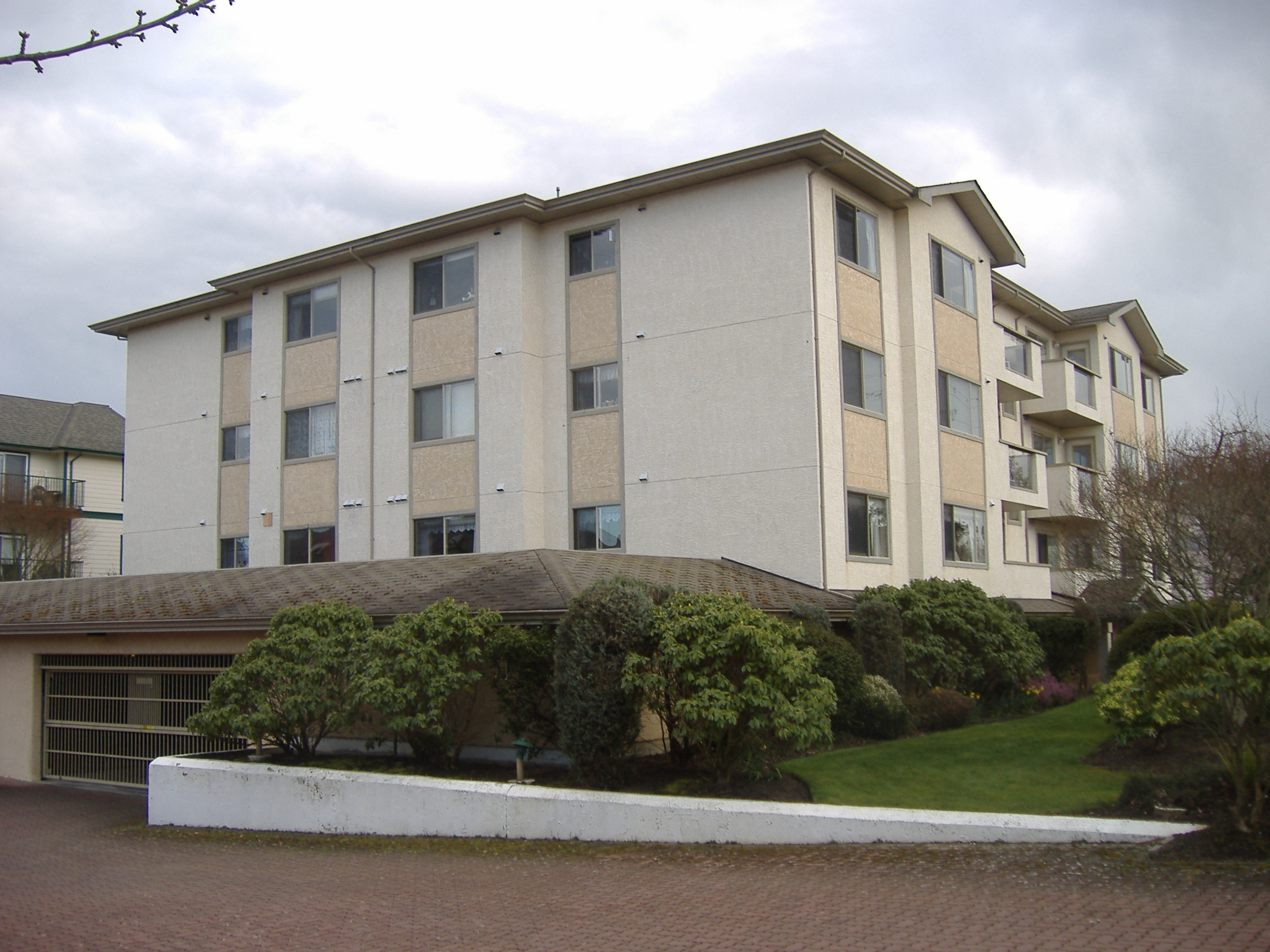
Typical condominium architecture in Sidney.

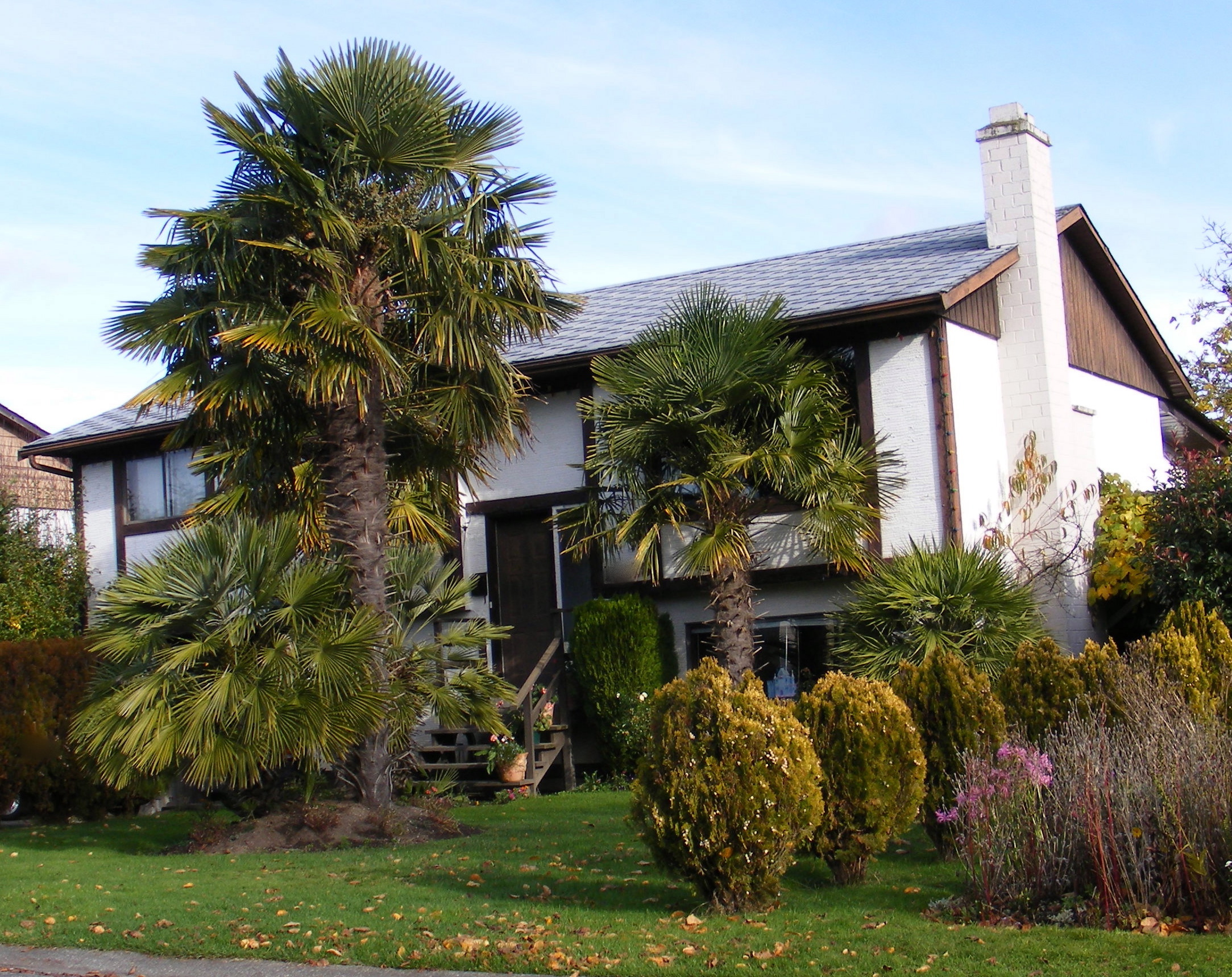
This single-family house in Sidney features a collection of palms, including Chinese windmill palm.

Sidney is a town located at the northern end of the Saanich Peninsula, on Vancouver Island in the province of British Columbia. It is one of the thirteen Greater Victoria municipalities. It has a population of approximately 11,583. Sidney is located just east of Victoria International Airport, and about 6 km (4 mi) south of BC Ferries' Swartz Bay Terminal. The town is also the only Canadian port-of-call in the Washington State Ferries system, with ferries running from Sidney to the San Juan Islands and Anacortes. Sidney is located along Highway 17, which bisects the town from north to south. It is generally considered part of the Victoria metropolitan area.

The town west of Highway 17 (also called Patricia Bay Highway, locally abbreviated as the Pat Bay Highway) has a mixture of single-family residences and light industry. The majority of the town is located east of Highway 17. Single-family units are also present east of the highway, but the eastern sector also has many condominium-type buildings, plus most of the service and retail outlets. The island-studded Haro Strait, part of the Salish Sea, forms Sidney's eastern boundary. There is a large boating and marine industry in the area, ranging from marinas to boatbuilders and marine suppliers.

Sidney takes its name from nearby Sidney Island. In 1859, Captain George Henry Richards named that island for Frederick W. Sidney, who like Richards served in the survey branch of the Royal Navy.

== Demographics ==
In the 2021 Census of Population conducted by Statistics Canada, Sidney had a population of 12,318 living in 5,981 of its 6,321 total private dwellings, a change of 5.5% from its 2016 population of 11,672. With a land area of 5.11 km^{2} (1.97 sq mi), it had a population density of 2,410.6/km^{2} (6,243.3/sq mi) in 2021.

Sidney has a median age of 60.4 in 2001 as compared with the British Columbia median age of 38.4. Sidney had more than 35% of their population over the age of 65.

=== Ethnicity ===
Panethnic groups in the Town of Sidney (2001−2021)
Panethnic group	2021		2016		2011		2006		2001	
Panethnic group	Pop.	%	Pop.	%	Pop.	%	Pop.	%	Pop.	%
European (Note: Statistic includes all persons that did not make up part of a visible minority or an indigenous identity.)	10,335	87.73%	10,070	90.52%	9,925	93.15%	10,350	94.01%	10,005	94.16%
Southeast Asian (Note: Statistic includes total responses of "Filipino" and "Southeast Asian" under visible minority section on census.)	485	4.12%	335	3.01%	175	1.64%	35	0.32%	130	1.22%
Indigenous	395	3.35%	360	3.24%	230	2.16%	250	2.27%	195	1.84%
East Asian (Note: Statistic includes total responses of "Chinese", "Korean", and "Japanese" under visible minority section on census.)	245	2.08%	140	1.26%	180	1.69%	155	1.41%	170	1.6%
South Asian	140	1.19%	90	0.81%	70	0.66%	65	0.59%	40	0.38%
African	60	0.51%	45	0.4%	15	0.14%	20	0.18%	55	0.52%
Latin American	60	0.51%	25	0.22%	40	0.38%	45	0.41%	20	0.19%
Middle Eastern (Note: Statistic includes total responses of "West Asian" and "Arab" under visible minority section on census.)	0	0%	10	0.09%	15	0.14%	0	0%	0	0%
Other/multiracial (Note: Statistic includes total responses of "Visible minority, n.i.e." and "Multiple visible minorities" under visible minority section on census.)	55	0.47%	45	0.4%	0	0%	75	0.68%	10	0.09%
Total responses	11,780	95.63%	11,125	95.31%	10,655	95.32%	11,010	97.3%	10,625	97.22%
Total population	12,318	100%	11,672	100%	11,178	100%	11,315	100%	10,929	100%
Note: Totals greater than 100% due to multiple origin responses.

=== Religion ===
According to the 2021 census, religious groups in Sidney included:

- Irreligion (6,150 persons or 52.2%)
- Christianity (5,330 persons or 45.2%)
- Judaism (55 persons or 0.5%)
- Sikhism (55 persons or 0.5%)
- Buddhism (35 persons or 0.3%)
- Islam (25 persons or 0.2%)
- Hinduism (15 persons or 0.1%)
- Other (105 persons or 0.9%)

== Labour force ==
Sidney is mainly an industrial town, with most people working in the construction, manufacturing, and warehousing fields (26%). Retail accounts for approximately 10% of the employment. Healthcare and social assistance employs 13%. There are over 4,000 people employed in Sidney, with an unemployment rate of 6.1%. It should also be taken into consideration that some of the labour force commutes from neighbouring municipalities, such as Saanich or Victoria. The median income is $24,638. The median income for a household in the town is $63,840. Renting costs in Sidney have increased substantially over the past few years, with a Standard 2 Bedroom Suite reaching as much as $2500 a month. The average cost of a house in Sidney in March 2019 was $645,500.

== Government ==
The Town of Sidney is a municipality governed by an elected Council, which, as of 2025, consists of one mayor and six councillors: Mayor Cliff McNeil-Smith, Councillor Sara Duncan, Councillor Terri O'Keeffe, Councillor Steve Duck, Councillor Scott Garnett, Councillor Richard Novek, and Councillor Chad Rintoul.

== Education ==
Public schools serving Sidney residents are operated by School District 63 Saanich and include Sidney Elementary School, North Saanich Middle School, and Parkland Secondary School.

== Sister city ==
On June 30, 2008, the Sidney Sister Cities Association and the town of Sidney, BC declared the twinning of Sidney and Niimi, Okayama, Japan. This was Sidney's third sister city, following Cairns, Queensland, Australia and Anacortes, Washington, United States.

== Attractions ==
Sidney's most popular attraction is its position on the Salish Sea. Sidney-by-the-Sea is the gateway to the southern Gulf Islands National Park Reserve, and is an eco-tourist destination, with whale-watching, bird-watching, kayaking and scuba-diving. It is home to the new Shaw Ocean Discovery Centre. Shoal Harbour Migratory Bird Sanctuary is located within Sidney and the adjoining Sidney Channel Important Bird Area, an internationally recognized site important to a variety of seabirds and waterfowl.

Sidney has its own local history museum, the Sidney Museum and Archives, which features displays about the history of the surrounding Peninsula as well as temporary exhibits. As home to the Victoria International Airport Sidney also hosts the British Columbia Aviation Museum which features displays, artifacts, restored historical aircraft and a vintage aircraft restoration workshop.

During the summer, Sidney hosts a street market on Thursday evenings on the main street (Beacon). "Sidney days" is another event that occurs at the beginning of July. To celebrate, Sidney has a parade, a build-a-boat contest, a small fair and fireworks in the evening. In the winter, Sidney has a holiday parade as well as a lighted sailpast boat parade. Sidney has many dining places including Greek, Thai, Chinese, Japanese, and west-coast restaurants. With 12 bookstores, Sidney is officially one of Canada's 2 book towns, the other being Fundy-St. Martins, New Brunswick. It also has almost as many coffee joints and cafes to sit and read in.

== Physiography ==
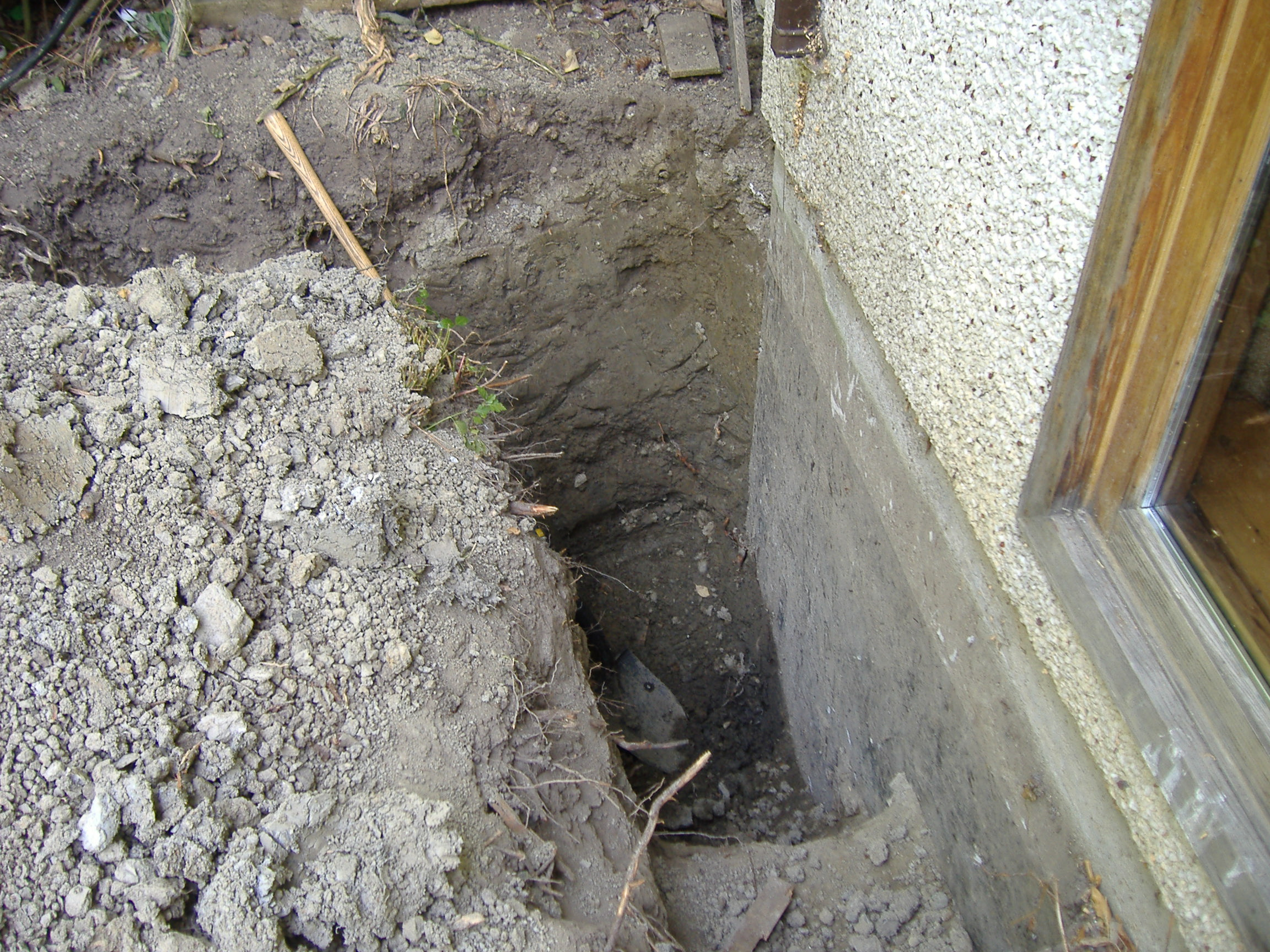
Maintenance of drainage systems is essential in the heavy clay soils which underlie most of Sidney.

Almost all of the land within Sidney's boundary is either flat or very gently sloping, providing a topography which is favourable for the town's elderly people. Most soils are clayey, and poorly drained in their natural state. In some parts of town, this clay is overlain by deposits of sand and gravel which are well drained.

== Climate ==
Sidney enjoys a cool Mediterranean climate (Csb) with year-round mild temperatures and moderate rainfall. Most years see very little snow. Daily temperatures seldom climb above 35 °C (95 °F), or dip below −7 °C (19 °F). In the mildest winters, minimum temperatures stay above −3 °C (27 °F). Damaging winds are less frequent than in most other maritime areas of Canada.

Climate data for Victoria International Airport (1981–2010)
Month	Jan	Feb	Mar	Apr	May	Jun	Jul	Aug	Sep	Oct	Nov	Dec	Year
Record high humidex	16.4	17.1	20.9	26.1	33.6	34.3	39.6	36.8	34.7	27.0	20.0	17.7	39.6
Record high °C (°F)	16.1 (61.0)	18.3 (64.9)	21.4 (70.5)	26.3 (79.3)	31.5 (88.7)	33.5 (92.3)	36.3 (97.3)	34.4 (93.9)	31.1 (88.0)	27.6 (81.7)	18.3 (64.9)	16.1 (61.0)	36.3 (97.3)
Mean daily maximum °C (°F)	7.6 (45.7)	8.8 (47.8)	10.8 (51.4)	13.6 (56.5)	16.9 (62.4)	19.9 (67.8)	22.4 (72.3)	22.4 (72.3)	19.6 (67.3)	14.2 (57.6)	9.7 (49.5)	7.0 (44.6)	14.4 (57.9)
Daily mean °C (°F)	4.6 (40.3)	5.1 (41.2)	6.8 (44.2)	9.0 (48.2)	12.1 (53.8)	14.9 (58.8)	16.9 (62.4)	16.8 (62.2)	14.2 (57.6)	10.0 (50.0)	6.4 (43.5)	4.0 (39.2)	10.0 (50.0)
Mean daily minimum °C (°F)	1.5 (34.7)	1.3 (34.3)	2.6 (36.7)	4.3 (39.7)	7.2 (45.0)	9.8 (49.6)	11.3 (52.3)	11.1 (52.0)	8.6 (47.5)	5.7 (42.3)	3.0 (37.4)	1.1 (34.0)	5.6 (42.1)
Record low °C (°F)	−15.6 (3.9)	−15.0 (5.0)	−10.0 (14.0)	−3.9 (25.0)	−1.1 (30.0)	2.1 (35.8)	4.1 (39.4)	4.4 (39.9)	−1.1 (30.0)	−4.4 (24.1)	−13.3 (8.1)	−14.4 (6.1)	−15.6 (3.9)
Record low wind chill	−19.1	−23.7	−13.9	−6.7	−5.3	0.0	0.0	0.0	0.0	−9.1	−19.4	−25.1	−25.1
Average precipitation mm (inches)	143.2 (5.64)	89.3 (3.52)	78.4 (3.09)	47.9 (1.89)	37.5 (1.48)	30.6 (1.20)	17.9 (0.70)	23.8 (0.94)	31.1 (1.22)	88.1 (3.47)	152.6 (6.01)	142.5 (5.61)	882.9 (34.76)
Average rainfall mm (inches)	132.8 (5.23)	83.0 (3.27)	75.2 (2.96)	47.5 (1.87)	37.5 (1.48)	30.6 (1.20)	17.9 (0.70)	23.8 (0.94)	31.1 (1.22)	88.0 (3.46)	148.4 (5.84)	129.7 (5.11)	845.3 (33.28)
Average snowfall cm (inches)	10.9 (4.3)	6.3 (2.5)	3.4 (1.3)	0.4 (0.2)	0.0 (0.0)	0.0 (0.0)	0.0 (0.0)	0.0 (0.0)	0.0 (0.0)	0.2 (0.1)	4.7 (1.9)	13.7 (5.4)	39.7 (15.6)
Average precipitation days (≥ 0.2 mm)	18.6	14.9	16.7	13.3	12.0	9.5	5.3	5.2	7.6	14.0	19.2	18.6	155.1
Average rainy days (≥ 0.2 mm)	17.8	14.3	16.5	13.3	12.0	9.5	5.3	5.2	7.6	14.0	18.7	17.6	151.9
Average snowy days (≥ 0.2 cm)	2.0	1.7	0.93	0.13	0.0	0.0	0.0	0.0	0.0	0.03	1.0	2.2	8.0
Average relative humidity (%)	78.2	70.1	66.0	60.3	59.5	57.5	55.9	56.7	60.0	69.3	77.4	79.4	65.8
Mean monthly sunshine hours	70.8	95.5	145.3	191.3	241.5	251.7	318.1	297.5	228.6	136.9	72.8	58.9	2,108.8
Percentage possible sunshine	26.0	33.3	39.5	46.7	51.2	52.2	65.4	66.9	60.3	40.7	26.2	22.7	44.3
Source: Environment Canada

== Fauna ==
The environs of Sidney provides habitat for a diverse array of fish and wildlife, both terrestrial and marine, coming and going with the seasons. For this reason it is a growing mecca for bird watchers, whale watchers, scuba-divers and eco-tourism. Sidney's most famous inhabitant is the bufflehead featured prominently on its coat of arms. The bufflehead is just one of many species of waterfowl that overwinter in Shoal Harbour Migratory Bird Sanctuary, one of the oldest marine sanctuaries on the west coast. Sidney overlooks Sidney Channel Important Bird Area, an internationally recognized site of major importance for many species of seabirds such as common murres, rhinoceros auklet, pigeon guillemots, murrelets, three species of cormorants, and several gull species, including the unusual Heermann's gull. Another resident bird is the bald eagle which has nested continuously in 'Beaufort Grove' for twenty-five years. In summer large numbers of great blue herons gather in Roberts Bay (part of Shoal Harbour Sanctuary) to feed on the abundant small fish. A variety of songbirds (towhees, American robins, Bewick's and winter wrens, bushtits, chickadees etc.) are found in back yards, along with the common northwestern crow, and introduced species such as the common starling and house sparrow. The airport lands around Sidney are the only place in North America where the song of the European skylark can be heard.

Marine mammals include the ubiquitous harbour seal and the small harbour porpoise. Occasionally gray whales and killer whales can be seen from Sidney's waterfront. Marine-adapted river otters are common coastal inhabitants, along with raccoon, and mink. Adjacent woodlands and farmlands are home to the small, shy black-tailed deer. In recent years, the introduced, invasive eastern grey squirrel has become abundant.

The waters around Sidney once supported a large sports fishery, based largely on Chinook salmon, along with ground fish such as ling cod, and various rockfish (Sebastes), but overfishing and poor management have greatly reduced the sports fishery. Also, ecological change and the decline of critical forage species such as the Pacific herring and the sand lance have had significant impacts on the larger predators, including salmon, killer whales and seabirds. Many of the common fish species and other marine fauna can be seen at the Shaw Ocean Discovery Centre on the Sidney waterfront.

== Flora ==
Sidney is situated within the coastal Douglas fir ecosystem, one of the most restricted ecosystems in Canada, dominated by large Douglas firs, along with its most distinctive species, the Arbutus and Garry oak in drier exposures, and the aptly named big leaf maple, and western red cedar in damper sites. Deciduous trees include the black cottonwood, Douglas maple, red alder, Pacific dogwood, bitter cherry, Pacific crab apple, cascara, quaking aspen, hawthorn and several species of willow. Coastal areas contain several unique plant communities including sea asparagus, salt grass and eelgrass, documented by the renowned botanist and explorer, John Macoun, after he retired as curator of the National Museum in 1912.

Many non-native plants also occur, including many invasive species such as English ivy, Scotch broom, laurel-leafed daphne, Himalayan blackberry, chicory, Queen Anne's lace, and red clover. Long-established exotic trees include London plane, horsechestnut, flowering cherry, flowering plum, Norway maple, sycamore maple, Japanese maple, catalpa and tulip tree. In recent years the American sweetgum, Freeman maple and Chinese windmill palm have become popular.
