= Battle-class destroyer =

Class of destroyers of the Royal Navy and the Royal Australian Navy

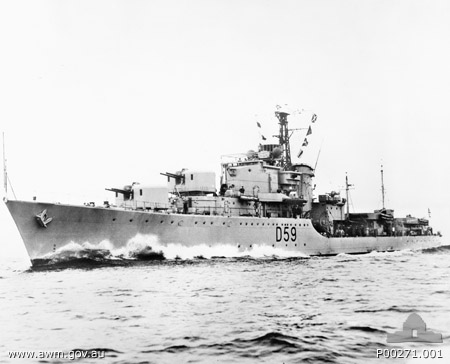
- HMAS Anzac

Class overview
- Name: Battle class
- Builders: Alexander Stephens & Sons; Cammell Laird; Cockatoo Docks and Engineering; Fairfield Shipbuilding & Eng.Co.; John Brown and Company; R. & W. Hawthorn, Leslie & Co.; Swan Hunter & Wigham Richardson; Vickers-Armstrongs; Williamstown Dockyard
- Operators: Royal Australian Navy; Royal Navy; Imperial Iranian Navy; Pakistan Navy
- Preceded by: Weapon class
- Succeeded by: Daring class
- Subclasses: "1942", "1943"
- Completed: 26
- Lost: 1

General characteristics
- Type: Destroyer
- Displacement: 1942 ships: 2,315 tons standard / 3,290 tons full load; 1943 ships: 2,480 tons standard / 3,430 tons full load
- Length: 379 ft (116 m)
- Beam: 1942 ships: 40 ft 3 in (12.27 m); 1943 ships: 40 ft 6 in (12.34 m)
- Draught: 12.75 ft (3.89 m) standard; 15.3 ft (4.7 m) full load
- Propulsion: 2 Admiralty 3-drum boilers, 2 Parsons geared steam turbines, 2 shafts, 50,000 shp (37 MW)
- Speed: 1942 ships: 34 knots (63 km/h); 1943 ships: 35.75 knots (66.21 km/h)
- Range: 4,400 nmi (8,100 km) at 20 knots (37 km/h)
- Complement: 1942 ships: 247 peacetime, 308 war; 1943 ships: 232 peacetime, 268 war
- Armament: 1942 Battle; 2 × twin 4.5 in guns QF Mark III on mounting BD Mk. IV; 1 × single 4 in gun QF Mk. XXIII on mount Mk. III (First six ships only. Later removed); 4 × twin 40 mm Bofors mounts "Hazemeyer" Mk. IV; 4-6 × single 40 mm Bofors mounts Mk. VII; 2 × quad tubes for 21 inch (533 mm) torpedoes Mk. IX; Two depth charge rails.; Four depth charge throwers.; Depth charges later replaced by 1 × Squid A/S mortar; 1943 Battle; 2 × twin 4.5 in guns QF Mark III on mount BD Mk. IV; 1 × single 4.5 in gun QF Mark IV on mount CP Mk. V; 2 × twin 40 mm Bofors mounts "STAAG" Mk. II; 1 × twin 40 mm Bofors mounts "utility" Mk. V; 2 × single 40 mm Bofors mount Mk. VII; 2 × quintuple tubes for 21 in torpedoes Mk. IX; 1 × Squid A/S mortar

The Battle class were a class of destroyers of the British Royal Navy (RN) and Royal Australian Navy (RAN), named after naval or other battles fought by British or English forces. Built in three groups, the first group were ordered under the 1942 naval estimates. A modified second and third group, together with two ships of an extended design were planned for the 1943 and 1944 estimates. Most of these ships were cancelled when it became apparent that the war was being won and the ships would not be required, although two ships of the third group, ordered for the RAN, were not cancelled and were subsequently completed in Australia.

Seven Battles were commissioned before the end of World War II, but only Barfleur saw action, with the British Pacific Fleet.

== "1942" or "Early Battle" class ==
The first years of World War II had shown that British destroyers were ill-equipped to deal with concentrated air attacks, and the Royal Navy suffered heavy losses as a result. In 1941 urgent consideration of the problem led to a naval staff requirement for a new class of large fleet destroyer with High Angle (HA) twin guns and an HA control system. It was decided that this main armament would be set forward in a superfiring configuration for all guns to engage one target. Arcs of fire were increased by setting the bridge structure further aft than normal. The proposed anti-aircraft (AA) armament were eight 40/60 mm guns in twin mountings set atop the middle and after deck houses to give all around, overlapping arcs of fire. These were to be supplemented by 20 mm guns positioned variously around the ship. Eight 21-inch (533 mm) torpedo tubes were to be carried in two quadruple mounts. A/S armament called for two depth charge rails and four depth charge throwers to be fitted. A new feature was the first use of stabilisers in a destroyer, providing a steadier platform for AA gunnery.

With these parameters accepted, a sketch design was approved in the autumn of 1941 and orders for sixteen ships (two flotillas) were placed under the 1942 programme. Considerably larger than the standard fleet destroyer, these ships were seen as a replacement for the Tribal class which had already suffered many losses. With a length of 379 feet (116 m) they were two feet longer than the Tribals and with a beam of 40 feet 3 inches (12.27 m) were just over three feet wider. It was decided to abandon the usual alphabetical naming of destroyer flotillas and name these ships after famous land and sea battles, thus these ships became known as the 1942 Battle class.

=== Orders and construction ===
The first ten ships were ordered on 27 April 1942. These comprised Barfleur, Trafalgar and St Kitts (with Swan Hunter, Wallsend); Armada, Solebay and Saintes (with Hawthorn Leslie); Camperdown and Finisterre (with Fairfield, Govan); and Hogue and Lagos (with White, Cowes).

The remaining six ships were ordered on 12 August 1942. These comprised Gabbard (with Swan Hunter); Gravelines and Sluys (with Cammell Laird); and Cadiz, St James and Vigo (with Fairfield, Govan). The order for Hogue and Lagos was moved from Whites to Cammell Laird on the same date.

=== Modifications ===
The placing of orders did not stop design work but by this time plans were too far advanced for big changes to be considered, although some design changes were made to the armament. One change, incorporated with protection against air-attack in mind, was the decision to standardise on the 4.5-inch gun for the main armament rather than the low angle 4.7 inch that was the usual destroyer gun and only effective against surface targets. The four 4.5 inch guns, fitted in two Mk IV turrets, were capable of high angle fire against aircraft and were controlled from a Director Control Tower (DCT) fitted with radar. Another alteration made whilst building was the fitting of a 4-inch gun on a gundeck abaft the funnel. It was also decided that the twin 40/60 mm guns would be fitted on Hazemeyer Mark IV mountings fitted with Radar Type 282. These would be mounted side by side on the middle gundeck between the torpedo tubes and en-echelon atop the after deckhouse. Due to delays in completion, the plans for 20 mm guns were altered and eventually four single 40/60 mm guns in Mk VII mountings were fitted, one forward of the bridge structure behind 'B' gun, one on either bridge wing and one aft on the quarterdeck.

Experience in the Pacific, against the Japanese, pointed to the limited usefulness of the 4 inch gun abaft the funnel and only the first ships completed, Barfleur, Armada, Trafalgar, Camperdown, Hogue and Lagos were fitted with the gun. In all other ships the gun was replaced by two single 40/60 mm Mk VII giving a total of 14 Bofors, the heaviest light AA armament of any British destroyer and heavier than that carried in many cruisers. In time, all the ships fitted with the 4 inch gun had them removed and replaced with the two single 40/60 mm Mk VII Bofors

All ships were completed with a lattice foremast, instead of the pole mast shown in the original plans. This enabled the ships to carry the latest radar and various IFF transponders and receivers on the foremast. Typical radar fit when built was the "cheese" of Type 293 target indication at the masthead, Radar Type 291 air warning on the mainmast and the twin nacelles Radar Type 275 fire control on the Mk. VI director.

=== Service ===
Delays in completion of these ships was caused, as in other classes, by the late delivery of the Mk VI DCTs and fire control systems. Barfleur was launched first in November 1943 and was completed by Swan Hunter in mid-1944 but by August her DCT had still not been delivered. Barfleur ran trials in September and was commissioned but had to return to the Tyne to await delivery and fitting of her director and fire control system. Other ships were similarly affected, Trafalgar spending many months laid up in the Tyne in 1944.

It was intended that the first eight ships would form the 19th Destroyer Flotilla with the British Pacific Fleet in the Far East, but only Barfleur reached the Pacific in time to take part in operations against Japan. Barfleur was in Tokyo Bay during the Japanese surrender ceremony on 3 September 1945 and after the end of the war she was joined by Armada, Trafalgar, Hogue, Lagos and Camperdown. In 1947 all six ships returned home and went into reserve.

The other two other ships destined for the 19th Flotilla, Solebay and Finisterre, were retained in home waters; Finisterre became gunnery training ship for the Portsmouth Command, and Solebay leader of the 5th Destroyer Flotilla, Home Fleet, which consisted of six ships of the second flotilla: Cadiz, Gabbard, St. James, St. Kitts, Saintes (see below) and Sluys. The other two ships of the second flotilla, Gravelines and Vigo, went straight into reserve upon completion.

The ships of the second flotilla saw a change in the light AA armament. The tri-axially stabilised Dutch "Hazemeyer" mountings with their Radar Type 282 were regarded as unreliable and were replaced by an Admiralty-designed Stabilised Tachymetric Anti Aircraft Gun (STAAG) mount. The Hazemeyer's Radar Type 282 was metric and operated through a pair of Yagi antennae and could therefore only supply target range. The British design used Radar Type 262 centimetric radar with a small spinning dish aerial, which gave range and bearing and was capable of "locking on" to a target and could train and elevate the guns as the target moved. The British design was more complicated than the Dutch design and weighed a massive 17 long tons (17 t) each (compared with the Hazemeyer's 7 long tons (7.1 t)). This meant that only two mountings could be installed, to keep the top hamper within acceptable limits. These were fitted to the top of the after deckhouse. The middle gundeck, between the torpedo tubes, was left empty. The mountings proved even less reliable than the ones they replaced and led to three ships Saintes, Camperdown and Trafalgar eventually having them replaced by Mk V "utility" mountings, each controlled by a Simple Tachymetric Director (STD) mounted on the top of the gun crew shelter. A further refinement saw the removal of the depth charge equipment and single 40/60 mm Bofors gun from the quarterdeck, to be replaced by a Squid ahead-throwing depth-charge mortar. The after deckhouse was extended to contain a mortar handling room. This eventually became standard for all of the 1942 Battles.

A variation occurred when Saintes was completed with a 4.5 inch RP 41 Mark VI turret in the "B" gun position. Commissioned in September 1946 into the 5th Destroyer Flotilla Saintes spent most of the time in independent trials of the new gun. Upon completion of trials Saintes paid off and was refitted with the standard Battle class armament, then laid up.

Saintes recommissioned in 1949 when, as D3 and with Armada, Vigo and Gravelines, they replaced Troubridge and the V class as the 3rd Destroyer Flotilla, Mediterranean Fleet. Barfleur replaced Gravelines in the 3rd Flotilla but no major changes took place until 1953. The appearance of the Darings at this time spelled the demise of the 5th Destroyer Flotilla, and after the Coronation Review all six ships went into reserve. Only two, Solebay and St. Kitts. saw further service with the Royal Navy. In 1956 Saintes headed home for a major refit at Rosyth, her crew transferring to Armada. Vigo also returning to home waters to replace Finisterre as gunnery training ship at Portsmouth. By late 1956 only four ships remained operational. Armada, Barfleur and St. Kitts with the 3rd Destroyer Squadron (as they were now called) and Vigo as Portsmouth Command gunnery training ship. All the other ships were either in reserve or refitting. Most had the fire control system updated and new ASDIC fitted, and those that still had the quarterdeck AA gun had it replaced by the Squid A/S mortar.

In 1957, the Ch-class destroyers of the 1st Destroyer Squadron were replaced by the newly refitted Solebay, Hogue and Lagos. Prior to 1960, Hogue filmed for destroyer night attack scenes used in the film Sink the Bismarck!. Initially serving with the Mediterranean Fleet, in 1959 the squadron deployed to the Far East, where Hogue's career came to an abrupt end. While participating in a night-time exercise with other navies off Ceylon on 25 August, Hogue collided with the Indian light cruiser INS Mysore, which rammed Hogue, crushing the destroyer's bow, killing a sailor and wounding three others. She was towed to Singapore where she was laid up until scrapped in 1962. Upon the return home of the remaining ships in 1960 Hogue was replaced in the squadron by Finisterre.

In 1957 a newly refitted Camperdown, which had been in reserve since returning from the Far East with the 19th Destroyer Flotilla ten years previously, was brought back into service to relieve St. Kitts in the 3rd Destroyer Squadron. The following year Saintes having finished her major refit at Rosyth resumed command of the 3rd Squadron, relieving Barfleur in the Mediterranean. Five years later St. Kitts was broken up at Sunderland; Barfleur was laid up for several years before being broken up at Dalmuir in 1966.

One other Battle was given a new lease of life. Trafalgar also laid up in 1947 was refitted and commissioned in 1958 as leader of the 7th Destroyer Squadron. She continued in service, alternating between the Home and Mediterranean Fleets until she finally paid off in 1963. In 1970 she arrived at Dalmuir to be broken up.

Gravelines and St. James also commenced refit at Devonport in 1958 but these were stopped a few months later. Both ships were sent to the breakers in 1961.

In 1957 Cadiz and Gabbard were sold to Pakistan and renamed Khaibar and Badr. Khaibar was lost to a missile attack in the Indo-Pakistani War of 1971.

Sluys ended 13 years in the Devonport reserve when she was sold to Iran in 1966. Renamed Artemiz she completed a three-year refit at Vosper Thornycroft at Southampton. Her profile was radically altered. She was given a new, plated foremast to carry the parabolic aerial of a Plessey AWS 1 long range search radar. A fully enclosed bridge replaced the usual "open sundeck" above the forward superstructure. She retained her 4.5 inch main armament, but these were now controlled by a modern radar and fire control system. Her AA armament now consisted of four single 40/60 mm guns and a quadruple Sea Cat missile launcher on the after end of a new deckhouse which stretched from just aft of the funnel to the quarterdeck. She commissioned in 1970 as a training ship. During 1975/6 she was refitted at Cape Town and fitted with surface-to-surface missile launchers. During a later refit carried out by the Russians, her main gunnery radar and control systems were again modernised, although she retained her original guns and the Sea Cat system was replaced by a modern Russian surface-to-air missile system. She was still in existence in the early 1990s although believed to be non-operational.

In 1960 the 1st and 3rd Destroyer Squadrons were amalgamated to form a new 1st Destroyer Squadron. As a result, Lagos and Armada paid off into reserve, Armada being broken up at Inverkeithing in 1965 and Lagos at Bo'ness in 1967.

The new 1st Destroyer Squadron completed a very busy final two-year commission before finally paying off in May 1962. Solebay became Portsmouth harbour training ship until being scrapped at Troon in 1967. Finisterre remained in Chatham reserve until being broken up at Dalmuir in 1967. Camperdown was laid up in the Hamoaze at Devonport for many years until finally being sent to the breakers yard at Faslane in 1970.

Now only Saintes remained. On paying off in 1962, a volunteer towing crew from her last commission took her to Rosyth, where she went into reserve. Here she was used as the training ship for Artificer Apprentices from HMS Caledonia who kept her engines and machinery in full working order. She was eventually replaced by the frigate Duncan in 1972 and she too headed for the breakers yard at Cairn Ryan, the last of the Royal Navy's 1942 Battle class destroyers.

== "1943" or "Later Battle" class ==
Even after the orders for the earlier, 1942 Battle class had been placed much discussion was still taking place within the naval staff about the final design. There was much debate about the type and disposition of the main armament. In some quarters it was felt that the two main turrets should be distributed one forward and one aft. Many reasons were given for this, but the most logical seems to have been preventing a single hit from disabling both guns. An argument was put forward in some quarters that these ships were underarmed for their size, and there was a call for a third turret to be mounted aft.

Admiral Andrew Cunningham, whilst taking passage in the 1942 Battle-class ship Solebay, was rather unflattering in his description of these ships saying that they were "too large" and "had every damned weapon and gadget except guns". Modern naval architects feel this is unfair as the role of destroyers had changed since the admiral commanded a destroyer at the battle of Jutland. The original role of the destroyers was torpedo attack on enemy ships, but their role in the late 1940s was to protect the fleet (and themselves) from aircraft and submarines. The Battle class were probably better at this task than any other Second World War British destroyer.

A further criticism, not just of the Battle-class design, but of British destroyers generally, was of the main machinery layout. Until 1936 all destroyers were laid out with three boiler rooms, as the naval staff considered this the minimum requirement for battle damage survivability. In 1936 the head of the destroyer section of the Constructors Department came up with a radical new design for the J class. This included a new system of longitudinal framing to both ease construction and increase the integral strength of the ships. It also called for a two-boiler layout with both boilers fitted back to back, allowing them to vent up a single large funnel. This decreased the ships silhouette and gave improved firing arcs for the anti-aircraft armament. This layout and hull design proved very effective and made for good-looking ships. The J-class design was used in all following destroyer designs until the advent of the Weapon and Daring classes. However, the boiler-room layout was a continuing source of criticism, as a single well-placed hit could cripple a ship completely.

In order to find a solution to these criticisms, it was originally planned that 32 ships (four flotillas) of an improved design would be built under the 1943 and 1944 Naval Estimates and that there would be changes in both armament and layout in the later ships. It was expected that the 4.5-in RP41 BD Mk VI turret, tested by Saintes from 1946/48, would be available to arm the later ships. Ultimately 26 ships were ordered. These formed two distinct groups, plus two ships of an expanded design.

The first 16 ships (two flotillas) were ordered in early 1943. They were based on a slightly widened version of the 1942 ships. They were to be fitted with the American Type 37 DCT which was now becoming available and which would be equipped with the British Radar Type 275 fire control set and Medium Range System (MRS) 9 fire control system. In an attempt to counter the criticisms that the ships were underarmed for their size, and were incapable of engaging a target right aft, a single 4.5 inch gun on a standard Mk V mounting would be positioned on the original 4 inch gun deck abaft the funnel. In the event, these guns failed to provide a solution as they were restricted to firing on either beam because the midship positioning meant their arc of fire was fouled by the ships fore and aft superstructure. The ships' AA armament was reduced to eight 40/60 mm Bofors, two twin STAAG Mk. II mountings on top of the after deckhouse, one twin Mk. V on the middle deckhouse controlled by an STD mounted on top of the gun crew shelter, and a single mounting Mk. VII on either bridge wing. All ships would be fitted with a Squid Anti-submarine mortar on the quarterdeck and ten 21-inch torpedo tubes in two quintuple mountings.

The last flotilla of eight ships and two ships of an expanded design were ordered under the 1944 estimates. The first eight ships were to be fitted with two twin 4.5-inch guns forward in the new RP41 Mk VI turrets. These turrets offered improved ammunition handling and a faster rate of fire due to their semi-automatic breech action and it was thought that this was sufficient to preclude the fitting of the single gun amidships. The bridge structure was raised as earlier trials in Saintes had noted that the higher profile of the Mk VI turret obstructed visibility forward. The AA armament was increased in these ships as the weight saved by dispensing with the single 4.5-inch gun amidships meant that a third twin STAAG could be fitted together with five single 40/60 mm guns giving a total of eleven light AA guns.

The two extended ships were intended to bury all criticisms of the design once and for all. The hull dimensions were increased, adding 10 feet (3.0 m) in length and 2.5 feet (0.76 m) to the beam. This allowed for a third twin 4.5-in Mk VI turret to be mounted aft. The main reason for the increase in length, however, was the planned change in the mechanical layout of these ships. Since the inception of the J class, the boilers had been concentrated together, an arrangement which allowed a reduced hull length. However, plans drawn up for the smaller Weapon class showed that this reduction was, in fact, minimal, so a decision was made to employ a unit arrangement for the propulsion machinery in these ships, based on the same lines as proposed for the Weapon class.

=== Orders and construction ===
Twenty-four ships (plus two of an enlarged/extended design) were included in the 1943 Programme. Six were ordered on 10 March 1943, with names commemorating land, as well as sea, battles: Agincourt and Alamein (from Hawthorn Leslie); Aisne and Albuera (from Vickers, Tyne); and Barrosa and Matapan (from John Brown, Clydebank).

Fifteen ships were ordered on 24 March 1943:Corunna, Oudenarde and River Plate (from Swan Hunter); Dunkirk, (original) Malplaquet and St Lucia (from Stephen); Belle Isle and Omdurman (from Fairfield); Jutland, Mons and Poictiers (from Hawthorn Leslie; Poictiers is the spelling used for Poitiers at the time of the battle); and Namur, Navarino, San Domingo and Somme (from Cammell Laird).

Five ships were ordered on 5 June 1943: Talavera and Trincomalee (from John Brown); Waterloo and Ypres (from Fairfield); and Vimiera (from Cammell Laird). The last two were the extended design and would eventually be built as the Daring Class.

=== Service ===
Although all of the ships were laid down between late 1943 and mid 1945 they, like previous members of the class, were plagued by delays in the provision of equipment. As a result, few had been launched by the end of hostilities and it became obvious that not all of them would be required. As a result, in September 1945, the Admiralty ordered work stopped on sixteen of the ships. As a result, seven ships, Mons, Omdurman, Somme, River Plate, St. Lucia, San Domingo and Waterloo, were broken up on the slipway. A further five, Belle Isle, Navarino, Poictiers, Talavera and Trincomalee were scrapped immediately upon launching. The uncompleted hulls of four ships, Albuera, Jutland, Namur and Oudenarde were laid up with the possibility that they could be completed at a later date. This policy was adopted with other classes of ship, notably cruisers and carriers, some of which were completed up to fourteen years after the end of the war. Although consideration was given to completing these vessels in 1950, it was never done and they were all scrapped between 1957 and 1961.

The two extended ships, Vimiera and Ypres were not scrapped at this time but eventually became a part of the Daring class, programme authorised in 1946. The original order was for sixteen ships, but construction was a long drawn out affair and eventually the Admiralty cancelled eight of the ships. At this time Vimiera, which had been renamed Danae was scrapped but Ypres was finally commissioned into the Royal Navy as HMS Delight.

This left a flotilla of eight ships, Agincourt, Aisne, Alamein, Barrosa, Corruna, Dunkirk, Jutland (ex-Malplaquet) and Matapan to be completed for service in the Royal Navy and, as with other ships built after the end of hostilities, work proceeded at a very slow pace. The first ship Agincourt was laid down in December 1943 but not completed until the end of June 1947. Alamein, laid down less than three months behind her sister ship, was not completed until May 1948.

It was originally intended that all eight ships would form the 4th Destroyer Flotilla, but by 1947 the post-war manning crisis had reached its peak and so Alamein, Barrosa, Corunna and Matapan went into reserve. This left only Agincourt, Aisne, Jutland (the original Malplaquet which had been renamed Jutland after launching) and Dunkirk in service.

1948, however, saw all but Matapan back in service with the Home Fleet, but just over a year later another reduction took place. In 1950 a decision was made to pay off several destroyers in the Home and Mediterranean Fleets and replace them with Loch-class frigates. Dunkirk, Barrosa and Alamein paid off into reserve and Aisne and Jutland were temporarily laid up for nearly a year.

In 1951 the 4th Destroyer Squadron was back in business. Consisting of Agincourt, Aisne, Jutland and Corunna and converted to General Service Commissions the squadron deployed between the Home and Mediterranean Fleets for the next few years. In 1953 Barrosa replaced Jutland and in 1957 Aisne was replaced by Alamein. In March 1959 there was a collision in the Bay of Biscay between Barrosa and Corunna. The following month the 4th Squadron was disbanded. Alamein went into reserve and was broken up at Blyth in 1964. Agincourt, Aisne, Barrosa and Corunna were placed in dockyard hands for conversion to radar pickets.

In 1958 Jutland and Dunkirk recommissioned as part of the 7th Destroyer Squadron. Led by the 1942 Battle Trafalgar, the squadron completed two General Service Home / Mediterranean Fleet deployments before Jutland paid off into reserve in 1961. She was broken up at Blyth in 1965. Dunkirk did a further two-year General Service deployment with the squadron before paying off in 1963. She was broken up at Faslane in 1965.

=== Aircraft Direction Conversion ===
As early as 1944 it had been suggested that the 1943 Battle class could be fitted with a long range early warning radar fitted to a mast amidships, albeit at the expense of some of the torpedo tubes and AA armament. The idea was not taken up at the time but in the early post-war years a need was identified for a Fast Air Detection Escort (FADE). These ships would accompany the fleet and detect, identify and track potential targets and direct friendly aircraft to engage them, a role known as Aircraft Direction (A/D).

A new frigate, the Type 61, was designed to carry out this role, however, it became clear that with a top speed of only 24 knots (44 km/h) these ships would not be able to keep up with a carrier group. Consideration was therefore given to converting existing ships to carry out this role with carrier groups. The latest long range radar available at that time was the Type 965. The Radar Type 965 came with two aerial configurations, the AKE-1, known as "the bedstead", and the AKE-2, known as "the double bedstead". The AKE-1 weighed in at almost two tons and the AKE-2 at a massive four tons. It soon became clear that only a large ship, like a "Battle" class destroyer would be able to carry such a load.

In 1955 a decision was made to convert four Battle class ships to Fast Air Detection Escorts, although the work was not started until 1959. The four ships chosen for conversion were Agincourt, Aisne, Barrosa and Corunna. On completion of the conversions only the hull, engines, funnel, forward superstructure and main armament remained of the original ships. A huge new lattice foremast was fitted immediately abaft the bridge. The base of this mast straddled the entire width of the ship and was surmounted by a large 4 ton Type 965 AKE-2 double bedstead aerial, with a Type 293Q mounted on a platform below. All torpedo tubes and light AA armament were removed and a large deckhouse containing generators and radar offices was built abaft the funnel. A new lattice mainmast carried a Radar Type 277Q height finder and an array of ESM and DF aerials. The after deckhouse was extended and a GWS 21 Sea Cat SAM system was mounted on top. The ships retained the Squid A/S mortar on the quarterdeck.

The conversions of Corunna at Rosyth Dockyard and Aisne at Chatham Dockyard were completed in 1962 and both ships joined the 7th Destroyer Squadron in the Mediterranean. On completion of her refit at Portsmouth, Agincourt joined the 5th DS in home waters. Corunna, however, ended up further afield. On completion of her refit at Devonport she joined the 8th Destroyer Squadron in the Far East. These arrangements were short lived as, in 1963, the Admiralty reorganised the frigate and destroyer squadrons into escort squadrons. Each escort squadron comprised a mix of ships of varying type in order to provide an increased capability within each group.

Corunna transferred to the 21st Escort Group which included a deployment to the Far East from September 1964 to August 1965. On returning home she began a refit at Rosyth in September 1965 and on completion in 1967 went into operational reserve at Portsmouth where she remained until put on the disposal list in 1972. In 1974 she was towed from Portsmouth to Sunderland for breaking but was then towed to Blyth and broken up in 1975.

Aisne transferred to the 23rd Escort Group and after a short spell joined 30th Escort Group in January 1964 and served in the Mediterranean from April to September 1964 and in the Far East from September to December 1964 and from July to December 1965. She recommissioned in January 1966 and served in the Far East from August 1966 to April 1967. In December 1967 she was sent to the West Indies, returning in March 1968. She paid off in August of that year and was broken up at Inverkeithing in 1970.

Agincourt spent four and a half years rotating between Home and Mediterranean waters, first as part of the 5th DS and then, after the reorganisation into Escort Squadrons, with 23ES and 27ES. Reduced to reserve at Portsmouth in October 1966 she was put on the disposal list in 1972. She was broken up at Sunderland in 1974.

Barrosa transferred to the 24ES and, apart from two spells at home between July 1966 and August 1967 and July to September 1968, spent all of her life as a radar picket serving in the Far East. She paid off into reserve at Devonport in December 1968. In 1971 she joined her sister ships at Portsmouth and was put on the disposal list in 1972. She was used as a stores hulk at Portsmouth until being towed to Blyth to be broken up in 1978.

The short life of these ships after their conversion was due to changes in defence policy made by the Labour Government which came to power in 1964. The decision to run down the carrier fleet, together with the withdrawal of British forces from the Far East, reduced the need for fast air direction ships. Moreover, the general purpose frigates then being built, such as the Leander class, were fitted with Type 965 radar and modern operations rooms, so they could replace the converted 'Battles' in most circumstances.

Armament summary

- 2 × twin 4.5 in guns QF Mark III on mount BD Mk. IV
- 1 × quad Sea Cat GWS-20 Surface-to-air missile system
- 2 × 20 mm Oerlikon guns
- 1 × Squid A/S mortar

=== HMS Matapan ===
Laid up on completion of her trials in 1947, having carried out only 150 hours steaming, the need to replace Verulam as Sonar Trials Ship for the Admiralty Underwater Weapons Establishment at Portland saw the conversion and eventual commissioning of Matapan. In 1971 Matapan was towed to Portsmouth to begin her conversion to sonar trials ship. She was stripped of all armament and the forecastle deck was extended right to the stern to provide increased space to accommodate scientists and trials equipment, plus a large Sick Bay. She was fitted with a second funnel for the exhausting of fumes from the extra generators required to power the sonar equipment. A plated foremast carried radar and communications aerials, and a new fully enclosed bridge was fitted. A new after deckhouse, which ran from the after funnel to the quarterdeck was fitted with a helicopter landing deck on the top. Her refit took two years but she finally commissioned in 1973. After 24 years in the Devonport reserve Matapan had finally found a role in the navy of the seventies. Her trials period lasted for five years, with a major deployment to the United States in 1976, working with US Navy submarines, much of the work of this vessel remains classified. She paid off at Portsmouth in 1977 and was broken up at Blyth in 1978.

== "1944" or "Australian Battle" class ==
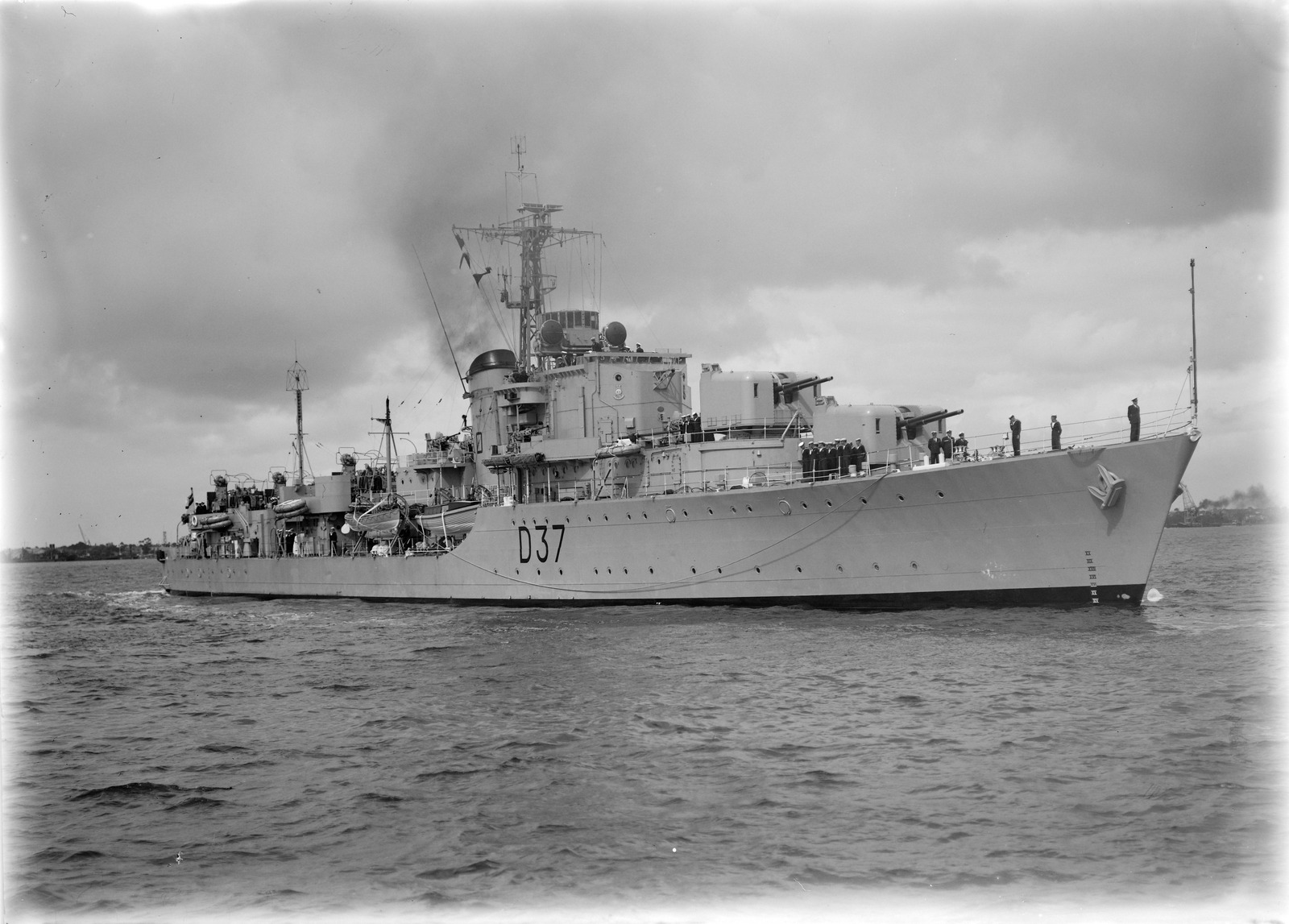
HMAS Tobruk in 1952

The original building programme for the 1943 ships included provision for the later ships, the third flotilla, to be armed with the new 4.5-inch Mark VI turret. Although these ships were cancelled by the Admiralty, two ships of this type had been ordered by the Royal Australian Navy (RAN) in Australia in 1945. Neither of these ships were cancelled and both ships were laid down in 1946, although, like the building programme in Britain, progress was slow. The first of the two ships, HMAS Anzac, was not completed by HMA Dockyard at Williamstown until 1950, and sister ship HMAS Tobruk, built at Cockatoo Island Dockyard in Sydney, was not completed until the following year. The only difference between these ships and those planned for the Royal Navy was a distinctive funnel cowl fitted to both ships.

Tobruk remained in service until 1960 when she was placed in reserve after being damaged in a friendly-fire accident. Anzac had her STAAG mountings removed at about this time and continued in service as a training ship. She was further modified for this role in 1966 when 'B' turret was removed and replaced by a deckhouse. Another deckhouse was built aft. She was laid up in 1974. Both ships were broken up in 1975.

Armament summary

- 2 × twin QF 4.5 inch /45 (113 mm) Mark V guns in 2 twin mountings UD Mark VI
- 3 × twin 40 mm Bofors mounts "STAAG" Mk. II
- 6-7 × single 40 mm Bofors mount Mk. VII
- 2 × quintuple tubes for 21 in torpedoes Mk. IX
- 1 × Squid A/S mortar

== Ships in class ==
List of Battle-class destroyers
Name of ship	Ordered	Service	Fate
HMS Barfleur	27 April 1942	Commissioned 1944, only member of Battle class to serve in WWII, in 19th Destroyer Flotilla in Pacific Fleet. Placed in Reserve Fleet 1947. 3rd Destroyer Flotilla in 1949. 3rd Destroyer Squadron in 1956.	Laid up 1958. Scrapped 1966.
HMS Trafalgar	27 April 1942	Deployed to Far East in 19th Destroyer Flotilla in 1945. Placed in Reserve Fleet 1947. 7th Destroyer Squadron 1958.	Laid up 1963. Scrapped 1970.
HMS St. Kitts	27 April 1942	5th Destroyer Flotilla from 1945. 3rd Destroyer Squadron in 1956.	Laid up 1957. Scrapped 1962.
HMS Armada	27 April 1942	Deployed to Far East in 19th Destroyer Flotilla in 1945. Placed in Reserve Fleet 1947. 3rd Destroyer Flotilla in 1949. 3rd Destroyer Squadron in 1956. Placed in Reserve Fleet 1960.	Laid up 1960. Scrapped 1967.
HMS Solebay	27 April 1942	5th Destroyer Flotilla from 1945. Placed in Reserve Fleet 1953. 1st Destroyer Squadron in 1957. Portsmouth Harbour Training Ship in 1962.	Paid off 1967. Scrapped 1967.
HMS Saintes	27 April 1942	5th Destroyer Flotilla from 1945. 3rd Destroyer Flotilla in 1949. Placed in Reserve Fleet 1953. 3rd Destroyer Squadron in 1958. 1st Destroyer Squadron in 1960. Artificer Training Ship in 1962	Decommissioned and scrapped 1970.
HMS Camperdown	27 April 1942	Deployed to Far East in 19th Destroyer Flotilla in 1945. Placed in Reserve Fleet 1947. 3rd Destroyer Squadron in 1957. 1st Destroyer Squadron in 1960. Decommissioned 1962	Laid up 1962. Scrapped 1970.
HMS Finisterre	27 April 1942	Gunnery Training Ship in Home Waters in 1945. Placed in Reserve Fleet 1953. 1st Destroyer Squadron in 1960 (to replace Hogue). Paid off into Reserve 1962.	Scrapped 1967.
HMS Hogue	27 April 1942	Deployed to Far East in 19th Destroyer Flotilla in 1945. Placed in Reserve Fleet 1947. 1st Destroyer Squadron in 1957. Collision in 1960.	Laid up 1960. Scrapped 1962.
HMS Lagos	27 April 1942	Deployed to Far East in 19th Destroyer Flotilla in 1945. Placed in Reserve Fleet 1947. 1st Destroyer Squadron in 1957. Placed in Reserve Fleet 1960.	Laid up 1960. Scrapped 1967.
HMS Gabbard	12 August 1942	5th Destroyer Flotilla from 1945. Placed in Reserve Fleet 1953. Struck off list in 1957.	Sold to Pakistan in 1957 and renamed PNS Badr.
HMS Gravelines	12 August 1942	Placed straight in Reserve Fleet on launch. 3rd Destroyer Flotilla in 1949. Placed in Reserve Fleet 1953. Refit started 1958.	Refit stopped and laid up 1958. Scrapped 1961.
HMS Sluys	12 August 1942	5th Destroyer Flotilla from 1945. Placed in Reserve Fleet 1953. Struck off list in 1966	Sold to Iran in 1966 and renamed INS Artemiz.
HMS Cadiz	12 August 1942	5th Destroyer Flotilla from 1945. Placed in Reserve Fleet 1953. Struck off list in 1957.	Sold to Pakistan in 1957 and renamed PNS Khaibar. Sunk during the Indo-Pakistan War of 1971.
HMS St. James	12 August 1942	5th Destroyer Flotilla from 1945. Placed in Reserve Fleet 1953. Refit started 1958.	Refit stopped and laid up 1958. Scrapped 1961.
HMS Vigo	12 August 1942	Placed straight in Reserve Fleet on launch. 3rd Destroyer Flotilla in 1949. Gunnery Training Ship in Home Waters in 1956. Cod War 1958–9. Paid off 1959 owing to hull damage.	Scrapped 1964.
HMS Agincourt	10 March 1943	4th Destroyer Flotilla in 1948. 4th Destroyer Squadron in 1951. Selected for refit into Fast Air Detection Escort in 1959. Recommissioned in 5th Destroyer Squadron in 1962. 23rd Escort Group in 1963 (27th thereafter). Placed in Reserve Fleet in 1966.	Struck off list in 1972. Scrapped in 1974.
HMS Alamein	10 March 1943	Launched into Reserve Fleet in 1947. Recommissioned in Home Fleet 1948. Placed in Reserve Fleet in 1950. 4th Destroyer Squadron in 1957. Placed in Reserve 1960.	Struck off list and scrapped in 1964
HMS Aisne	10 March 1943	4th Destroyer Flotilla in 1948. 4th Destroyer Squadron in 1951. Paid off 1957. Selected for refit into Fast Air Detection Escort in 1959. Recommissioned in 7th Destroyer Squadron in 1962. 23rd Escort Group in 1963. 30th Escort Group in 1964. Paid off 1968.	Struck off list and scrapped in 1970.
HMS Albuera	10 March 1943	—N/a	sold incomplete for scrapping 21 November 1950
HMS Barrosa	10 March 1943	Launched into Reserve Fleet in 1947. Recommissioned in Home Fleet 1948. Placed in Reserve Fleet in 1950. 4th Destroyer Squadron in 1953. Selected for refit into Fast Air Detection Escort in 1959. Recommissioned in 8th Destroyer Squadron in 1962. 24th Escort Group in 1963. Placed in Reserve Fleet in 1968.	Struck off list in 1972. Used as stores hulk. Scrapped in 1978.
HMS Matapan	10 March 1943	Launched into Reserve Fleet in 1947. Converted into sonar trials ship in 1971, recommissioned 1973. Working with US Navy 1973–1977. Paid off 1977.	Struck off list in 1977. Scrapped in 1978.
HMS Corunna	24 March 1943	Launched into Reserve Fleet in 1947. Recommissioned in Home Fleet 1948. 4th Destroyer Squadron in 1951. Selected for refit into Fast Air Detection Escort in 1959. Recommissioned in 7th Destroyer Squadron in 1962. 21st Escort Group in 1963. Paid off to refit 1965. Placed in Reserve Fleet in 1967.	Struck off list in 1972. Scrapped in 1975.
HMS Oudenarde	24 March 1943	—N/a	Hull not completed and scrapped in late 1950s
HMS River Plate	24 March 1943	—N/a	Broken up on the slipway
HMS Dunkirk	24 March 1943	4th Destroyer Flotilla in 1948. Placed in Reserve Fleet in 1950. 7th Destroyer Squadron in 1958. Placed in Reserve 1963.	Struck off list and scrapped in 1965
HMS Jutland (originally ordered as Malplaquet, but name changed after launching)	24 March 1943	4th Destroyer Flotilla in 1948. 4th Destroyer Squadron in 1951. Paid off 1953. 7th Destroyer Squadron in 1958. Placed in Reserve 1961.	Struck off list and scrapped in 1965
HMS St. Lucia	24 March 1943	—N/a	Broken up on the slipway
HMS Belle Isle	24 March 1943	—N/a	Scrapped immediately upon launching
HMS Omdurman	24 March 1943	—N/a	Broken up on the slipway
HMS Jutland	24 March 1943	—N/a	Hull not completed and scrapped in late 1950s
HMS Mons	24 March 1943	—N/a	Broken up on the slipway
HMS Poitiers	24 March 1943	—N/a	Scrapped immediately upon launching
HMS Namur	24 March 1943	—N/a	Hull not completed and scrapped in late 1950s
HMS Navarino	24 March 1943	—N/a	Scrapped immediately upon launching
HMS San Domingo	24 March 1943	—N/a	Broken up on the slipway
HMS Somme	24 March 1943	—N/a	Broken up on the slipway
HMS Talavera	5 June 1943	—N/a	Scrapped immediately upon launching
HMS Trincomalee	5 June 1943	—N/a	Scrapped immediately upon launching
HMS Waterloo	5 June 1943	—N/a	Broken up on the slipway
HMS Ypres	5 June 1943	Construction stopped. Reordered as Daring-class HMS Delight (D119) in 1950, and commissioned 1953	Decommissioned 1970.
HMS Vimiera	5 June 1943	—N/a	Construction stopped. Reordered as Daring-class HMS Danae but scrapped on launch.

== See also ==
- List of ship classes of the Second World War
- Nueva Esparta-class destroyer

== Publications ==
- Brown, Paul (February 2017), "Britain's Battling destroyers", Ships Monthly: 28–31
- Colledge, J. J.; Warlow, Ben (2006) [1969]. Ships of the Royal Navy: The Complete Record of All Fighting Ships of the Royal Navy from the 15th Century to the Present (3rd Rev ed.). London: Chatham Publishing. ISBN 978-1-86176-281-8. OCLC 67375475.
- Hodges, Peter (1971). Battle Class Destroyers. London: Almark Publishing. ISBN 0-85524-012-1.
- D.K. Brown, Nelson to Vanguard, Chatham Publishing (2000)
- Conway's All the World's Fighting Ships 1947–1995
- G. Moore, The 'Battle' Class destroyers in Warship 2002–2003, Conway's Maritime Press
- M. Critchley, British Warships Since 1945, Part 3, Destroyers
- L. Marriott, Royal Navy Destroyers Since 1945
