= HMS Alamein =

Battle-class destroyer

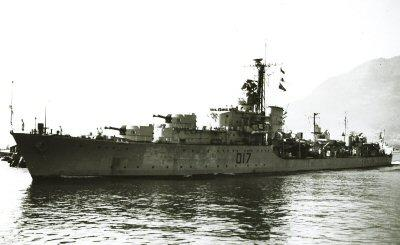

History

United Kingdom
- Name: HMS Alamein
- Ordered: 1943
- Builder: Hawthorn Leslie and Company
- Laid down: 1 March 1944
- Launched: 12 May 1945
- Commissioned: 20 March 1947
- Decommissioned: 1959
- Fate: Broken up 1964

General characteristics
- Class & type: Battle-class destroyer
- Displacement: 2,480 tons standard
- Length: 379 ft (116 m)
- Beam: 40 ft 6 in (12.34 m)
- Draught: 12 ft 8 in (3.86 m) mean; 17 ft 6 in (5.33 m) maximum
- Propulsion: Oil fired, two three-drum boilers, Parsons geared turbines, twin screws, 50,000 hp (37 MW)
- Speed: 35.75 knots (66.21 km/h)
- Complement: 268
- Armament: 5 × 4.5 in (114 mm) gun; 8 × Bofors 40 mm guns; 10 × 21 in (533 mm) torpedo tubes; 2 × Squid mortar

Service record
- Part of: 4th Destroyer Squadron

HMS Alamein (D17) was a Later or 1943 Battle-class fleet destroyer of the British Royal Navy. She was named in honour of the Battle of El Alamein, which took place in 1942 during the Second World War, between Commonwealth forces and the German Afrika Korps.

Alamein was built by R. & W. Hawthorn, Leslie & Company Limited on the Tyne. She was launched on 12 May 1945 and commissioned on 20 March 1946.

== Service ==
In 1946, Alamein joined the 4th Destroyer Flotilla, part of the Home Fleet. In 1948, Alamein, along with her sister-ship HMS Barrosa, escorted the aircraft carrier HMS Vengeance for exercises in Northern and Home waters, though she did not join the two on their subsequent visit to Northern Ireland.

In 1950, Alamein deployed on a Home Fleet Spring Cruise, which included many other vessels, such as HMS Victorious, two other carriers, the battleship HMS Vanguard and many smaller vessels. The group visited the Mediterranean, including stops at Italy, and performed a number of naval exercises and fly-the-flag visits in the region. That same year, Alamein decommissioned, being placed in Reserve.

In May 1956, Alamein, as part of the 4th Destroyer Squadron once more after replacing her sister ship HMS Aisne, had spells with the Home and Mediterranean Fleets, taking part in the Suez Crisis.

On 5 November 1958, in Chatham Dockyard, a fire occurred onboard Alamein. which was eventually traced to faulty wiring on radio equipment in the Wardroom, which spread to the Ops Room. Fire Parties from Alamein, HMS Corruna, whom she was alongside, plus Chatham & Gillingham fire brigades fought the blaze.

In 1959, Alamein was decommissioned and placed in Reserve for the final time, being broken up at Blyth in Northumberland in 1964.

== Publications ==
- Colledge, J. J.; Warlow, Ben (2006) [1969]. Ships of the Royal Navy: The Complete Record of All Fighting Ships of the Royal Navy from the 15th Century to the Present (3rd Rev ed.). London: Chatham Publishing. ISBN 978-1-86176-281-8. OCLC 67375475.
- Hodges, Peter (1971). Battle Class Destroyers. London: Almark Publishing. ISBN 0-85524-012-1.
