= 3rd Destroyer Squadron =

- Active: December 1952 – 2001
- Country: United Kingdom
- Branch: Royal Navy
- Size: Squadron

Commanders
- First: Hector C. D. MacLean
- Last: Captain C. Joseph Gass

The 3rd Destroyer Squadron was a naval unit of the Royal Navy from 1952 to 2001.

== Overview ==
After World War II, the Royal Navy reverted to its previous layout and command structure in July 1951 the 3rd Destroyer Flotilla of the Mediterranean Fleet was disbanded. In February 1952 a new 3rd Destroyer Squadron was activated. The Admiralty controlled global deployment until 1964, when that department was abolished and replaced by the Navy Department, Ministry of Defence. Geographic commands usually consisted of fleets, squadrons, flotillas, and single ships. In 1954, major re-structuring of the navy was undertaken, leading to downsizing of administrative requirements. Warships were then rotated between the various fleets and stations. From 1954 until 1971, many naval commands were abolished or amalgamated into larger commands. In November 1971, nearly all British naval forces were brought under the command of a single fleet at Northwood Headquarters. under the control of Commander-in-Chief Fleet. In 2012 that post was abolished and replaced by the Fleet Commander, who administered the fleet from Navy Command Headquarters in Portsmouth, Hampshire.

== Organizational changes ==
Note: Command structure organizational changes took place within Royal Navy post war period the term Flotilla was previously applied to a tactical unit until 1951 which led to the creation of three specific Flag Officers, Flotillas responsible for the Eastern, Home and Mediterranean fleets the existing destroyer flotillas were re-organized now as administrative squadrons.

== Operational history ==
Deployments included:

- Assigned to Mediterranean Fleet - (1952-1956)
- Assigned to Home Fleet - (1956-1958)
- Assigned to First Flotilla, Fleet (1980- 1995)
- Assigned to the Fleet - (1996-2002)

Notes:Revived as 3rd Far East Destroyer Squadron, (January 1967-January 1972)

== Composition ==
Included:
(United Kingdom) , Mediterranean Fleet 1952
3rd Destroyer Squadron

- HMS Saintes (Leader)
- HMS Armada
- HMS Gravelines
- HMS Vigo

(United Kingdom) , Mediterranean Fleet 1953
3rd Destroyer Squadron

- HMS Saintes (Leader)
- HMS Armada
- HMS Gravelines
- HMS Vigo - (July 1953)
- HMS St. Kitts - (July 1953)
- HMS St. Kitts - (November 1953)

(United Kingdom) , Mediterranean Fleet 1954
3rd Destroyer Squadron

- HMS Saintes (Leader)
- HMS Barfleur
- HMS St. Kitts

(United Kingdom) , Mediterranean Fleet 1954-1956
3rd Destroyer Squadron

- HMS Saintes (Leader)
- HMS Armada (Leader)
- HMS Barfleur
- HMS St. Kitts

(United Kingdom) , Home Fleet 1956
3rd Destroyer Squadron

- HMS Armada (Leader)
- HMS Barfleur
- HMS St. Kitts

(United Kingdom) , Home Fleet 1957
3rd Destroyer Squadron

- HMS Armada (Leader)
- HMS Barfleur
- HMS St. Kitts

(United Kingdom) , Home Fleet 1958
3rd Destroyer Squadron

- HMS Armada (Leader)
- HMS Barfleur
- HMS Camperdown

(United Kingdom) , First Flotilla, Fleet 1980-1995
3rd Destroyer Squadron, Portsmouth & Rosyth

- HMS Edinburgh (Leader)
- HMS Liverpool (Leader)
- HMS Newcastle (Leader)
- HMS York - (Leader)
- HMS Sheffield
- HMS Birmingham
- HMS Glasgow
- HMS Coventry
- HMS Cardiff
- HMS Nottingham

(United Kingdom) , The Fleet 1996
3rd Destroyer Squadron

- HMS Liverpool - (Leader)
- HMS Birmingham - (December 1999)
- HMS Glasgow
- HMS Nottingham
- HMS York
- HMS Edinburgh

(United Kingdom) , The Fleet 1997
3rd Destroyer Squadron

- HMS Liverpool - (Leader)
- HMS Birmingham - (December 1999)
- HMS Glasgow
- HMS Nottingham
- HMS York
- HMS Edinburgh

(United Kingdom) , The Fleet 1998
3rd Destroyer Squadron

- HMS Liverpool - (Leader)
- HMS Birmingham - (December 1999)
- HMS Glasgow
- HMS Nottingham
- HMS York
- HMS Edinburgh

(United Kingdom) , The Fleet 1999
3rd Destroyer Squadron

- HMS Liverpool - (Leader)
- HMS Birmingham - (December 1999)
- HMS Glasgow
- HMS Nottingham
- HMS York
- HMS Edinburgh

(United Kingdom) , The Fleet 2000
3rd Destroyer Squadron

- HMS Edinburgh - (Leader)
- HMS Glasgow
- HMS Liverpool - (Lead ship)
- HMS Nottingham
- HMS York

(United Kingdom) , The Fleet 2001-2002
3rd Destroyer Squadron

- HMS Edinburgh - (Leader)
- HMS Glasgow
- HMS Liverpool
- HMS Nottingham
- HMS York

== Squadron commander ==
Included:

Commander	Lead Ship	Dates
Captain Hector C. D. MacLean	HMS Saintes	February 1952-July 1953
Captain Desmond P, Dreyer	HMS Saintes	July 1953-April 1955
Captain A, A, Fitzroy Talbot	HMS Saintes/HMS Armada	April 1955-March 1957
Captain Eric V. St. J. Morgan	HMS Armada	March 1957-August 1958
Captain Ottoker H.M. St. J. Steiner	HMS Saintes	August 1958 – 1960
Squadron	Disbanded	1960-June 1980
Captain Norman R.D. King	HMS Newcastle	June–October 1980
Captain Derek A. Wallis	HMS Newcastle	October 1980-July 1982
Captain Anthony D. Hutton	HMS Newcastle	July 1982-September 1984
Captain Peter J. Erskine	HMS Newcastle	September 1984-February 1986
Captain John R. Brigstocke	HMS York	April 1986-April 1987
Captain David A.J. Blackburn	HMS York	April 1987-September 1988
Captain Peter J. Cowling	HMS York	September 1988-January 1990
Captain Anthony G. McEwen	HMS York	January 1990-May 1991
Captain Roy A.G. Clare	HMS York	May 1991 – 1992
Captain Paul D. Stone	HMS York	1992-December 1993
Captain Laurence C. Hopkins	HMS Liverpool	December 1993-July 1995
Captain Roger S. Ainsley	HMS Liverpool	July 1995 – 1997
Captain David G. Snelson	HMS Liverpool	1997-1998
Captain Philip L. Wilcocks	HMS Liverpool	1998-August 1999
Captain Richard C. Twitchen	HMS Liverpool	August 1999-December 2000
Captain C. Joseph Gass	HMS Edinburgh	December 2000 – Nov 2001
Captain Timothy P. Fraser (also Captain D5)	HMS Cardiff (in both D3 and D5)	November 2001-February 2002

Of note, for the last few months of its existence, Command of the 3rd Destroyer Squadron was combined with that of the 5th Destroyer Squadron, as the "Commander of the 3rd and 5th Destroyer Squadrons" prior to abolition of both squadrons and the incorporation of all the Type 42 destroyers within the newly established Portsmouth Flotilla.

== See also ==
- List of squadrons and flotillas of the Royal Navy

== Sources ==
- Mackie. Colin (2017). British Armed Forces from 1860. Senior Royal Navy Appointments from 1865: Gulabin. http://www.gulabin.com/.
- Smith. Gordon and Watson, Graham. (2015) The Royal Navy, post 1945. Royal Navy Organisation and Ship Deployments 1947–2013. http://www.naval-history.net.
