= HMS Barrosa (D68) =

Battle-class destroyer

- HMS Barrosa

History

United Kingdom
- Name: HMS Barrosa
- Ordered: 1943
- Builder: John Brown & Company, Clydebank
- Yard number: 615
- Laid down: 28 December 1943
- Launched: 17 January 1945
- Commissioned: 14 February 1947
- Decommissioned: 1968
- Fate: Broken up 1978

General characteristics
- Class & type: Battle-class destroyer
- Displacement: 2,480 tons standard
- Length: 379 ft (116 m)
- Beam: 40 ft 6 in (12.34 m)
- Draught: 12 ft 8 in (3.86 m) mean; 17 ft 6 in (5.33 m) maximum
- Propulsion: Oil fired, two three-drum boilers, Parsons geared turbines, twin screws, 50,000 hp (37 MW)
- Speed: 35.75 knots (66.21 km/h)
- Complement: 268
- Armament: Originally: 5 × 4.5-inch (114 mm) gun; 8 × Bofors 40 mm guns; 10 × 21 inch (533 mm) torpedo tubes; 1 × Squid mortar; Later: Sea Cat missiles

Service record
- Part of: 4th Destroyer Flotilla; 4th Destroyer Squadron; 8th Destroyer Squadron; 24th Escort Squadron

HMS Barrosa (D68) was a later or 1943 Battle-class fleet destroyer of the Royal Navy.

== Design and construction ==
The Battle-class was developed as a result of operational experience in the early years of the Second World War, which had shown that the Royal Navy's existing destroyers had inadequate anti-aircraft protection, and in particular, lacked a modern dual-purpose main gun armament, capable of dealing with both surface targets and air attack, with guns lacking the high elevation mountings necessary to deal with dive bombers. The resulting design was armed with two twin 4.5 inch high-angle gun-turrets of a new design mounted forward and a heavy close-in anti-aircraft armament, with 16 Battle-class destroyers ordered under the 1942 construction programme.

For the 1943 construction programme, 24 Battle-class destroyers of a revised design (known as "1943 Battles") were ordered, with four destroyers (Barrosa, Matapan, Talavera and Trincomalee) to be built by the Scottish shipbuilder, John Brown & Company.

Barrosa was 379 ft 0 in (115.52 m) long overall, 364 ft 0 in (110.95 m) at the waterline and 355 ft 0 in (108.20 m) between perpendiculars, with a beam of 40 ft 6 in (12.34 m) and a draught of 12 ft 9 in (3.89 m) normal and 15 ft 6 in (4.72 m) at full load. Displacement was 2,550 long tons (2,590 t) standard and 3,420 long tons (3,470 t) full load. Two Admiralty 3-drum boilers supplied steam at 400 psi (2,800 kPa) and 700 °F (371 °C) to two sets of Parsons single-reduction geared steam turbines which drove two propeller shafts. The machinery was rated at 50,000 shp (37,000 kW), giving a speed of 34 kn (39 mph; 63 km/h) (31 kn (36 mph; 57 km/h) at full load. 766 long tons (778 t) of fuel oil was carried, giving an endurance of 4,400 nmi (5,100 mi; 8,100 km) at 20 kn (23 mph; 37 km/h).

Two twin 4.5 inch (113 mm) Mark IV gun mounts, capable of elevating to 85 degrees, were mounted forward, while a single 4.5 inch gun, elevating to 55 degrees was fitted behind the funnel - this fifth gun, which could fire astern, replaced a 4-inch gun fitted to the 1942 Battles used for firing Star shell and could be controlled by the main fire control system. Close-in anti-aircraft armament was eight Bofors 40 mm gun, with two twin stabilised STAAG mounts, with integrated fire control, aft, one simple Mark V twin mount amidships, and two single mounts on the bridge wings. Two quintuple 21 inch (533 mm) torpedo-tubes were fitted, with a Squid anti-submarine mortar aft.

Barrosa, named after the Battle of Barrosa, which took place in 1811 between British-Allied forces and France, and which ended in a French defeat. was one of six 1943 Battles ordered on 10 March 1943. The destroyer was laid down by John Brown at their Clydebank shipyard as Yard number 615 on 28 December 1943, launched on 17 January 1945 and completed on 14 February 1947.

== Operations ==
On commissioning, Barrosa joined the 4th Destroyer Flotilla of the Home Fleet, but later in the year, a manpower shortage caused most of the Flotilla, including Barrosa to be laid up in reserve. Barrosa returned to active duties with the 4th Flotilla in 1948. On 12 November 1949, Barrosa collided with the oiler Black Ranger, damaging some of the destroyer's portholes and causing a small split in her hull. In 1950, Barrosa with one of her sister ships and the aircraft carrier HMS Vengeance, where the small group performed a number of naval exercises and visits to a variety of ports. In April 1950, Barrosa was placed in Reserve, as part of a wider transfer of destroyers to reserve with Loch-class frigates being returned to active service to improve the Royal Navy's anti-submarine capability.

On 2 May 1952, Barrosa recommissioned into the 4th Destroyer Squadron, manned by the crew of Jutland, which went into reserve on the same day. In June 1953, Barrosa took part in the Coronation Fleet Review at Spithead in honour of the newly crowned Queen Elizabeth II. Barrosa was positioned in the middle of her sister ships HMS Aisne and HMS Agincourt. Barrosa spent much of her time in the Mediterranean, duties including anti-arms smuggling patrols off Cyprus.

In November 1956 Barrosa formed part of the Royal Navy force deployed in the eastern Mediterranean during the Suez Crisis, as part of the 4th Destroyer Squadron.

== Refit and conversion to radar picket ==
On 15 March 1959, Barrosa collided with her sister ship HMS Corunna in the Bay of Biscay. Later that year, Barrosa entered an extensive programme of modification to become a radar picket, with the addition of the Sea Cat missile, as well as new anti-aircraft weaponry and new radar. In 1963 Barrosa joined the 8th Destroyer Squadron, based in the Far East, before joining the 26th Escort Squadron. As well as radar picket duties, tasks included operations against pirates, and on 10 February 1963, Barrosa intercepted a pirate boat, with a gun battle occurring between Barrosa' s search party and the pirates, with one of the destroyer's crew killed. The ship also carried out anti-infiltration patrols during the Indonesia–Malaysia confrontation.

In March 1967, at the start of her final commission, Barrosa was used in attempts to break up the oil spill from the supertanker Torrey Canyon, which had run aground off Cornwall, with detergent. In November 1967, she formed part of a naval task force deployed to cover the British Withdrawal from Aden. Other duties during this last commission included taking part in the Beira Patrol. On 2 October 1968, Barrosa took the Royal Fleet Auxiliary stores ship Lyness in tow after Lyness' engine had broken down east of Shetland, stopping the supply ship from being driven onto rocks until power could be restored.

In December 1968 Barrosa was decommissioned and was listed for disposal in 1972. By 1974 Barrosa was being used as a storage hulk at Portsmouth. She arrived at Blyth in Northumberland for scrapping on 1 December 1978.

== Bibliography ==
- Colledge, J. J.; Warlow, Ben (2006) [1969]. Ships of the Royal Navy: The Complete Record of All Fighting Ships of the Royal Navy from the 15th Century to the Present (3rd Rev ed.). London: Chatham Publishing. ISBN 978-1-86176-281-8. OCLC 67375475.
- Critchley, Mike (1982). British Warships Since 1945: Part 3: Destroyers. Liskeard, UK: Maritime Books. ISBN 0-9506323-9-2.
- English, John (2008). Obdurate to Daring: British Fleet Destroyers 1941–45. Windsor, UK: World Ship Society. ISBN 978-0-9560769-0-8.
- Friedman, Norman (2008). British Destroyers and Frigates: The Second World War and After. Barnsley, UK: Seaforth Publishing. ISBN 978-1-84832-015-4.
- Hodges, Peter (1971). Battle Class Destroyers. London: Almark Publishing. ISBN 0-85524-012-1.
- Lenton, H. T. (1970). Navies of the Second World War: British Fleet and Escort Destroyers: Volume Two. London: Macdonald & Co. (Publishers) Ltd. ISBN 0-356-03122-5.
- Manning, T. D.; Walker, C. F. (1959). British Warship Names. London: Putnam.
- Marriott, Leo (1989). Royal Navy Destroyers Since 1945. Shepperton, UK: Ian Allan. ISBN 0-7110-1817-0.
- Roberts, John (2009). Safeguarding the Nation: The Story of the Modern Royal Navy. Annapolis, Maryland, USA: Naval Institute Press. ISBN 978-1-59114-812-8.
