= D84 =

D84 may refer to:

- HMAS Australia (D84)
- HMS Keppel (D84)
- HMS Saintes (D84)
- PNS Babur (D84)

== See also ==
- D. 84, Singspiel Des Teufels Lustschloß by Franz Schubert (1812)
