= HMS Gravelines =

Battle-class destroyer

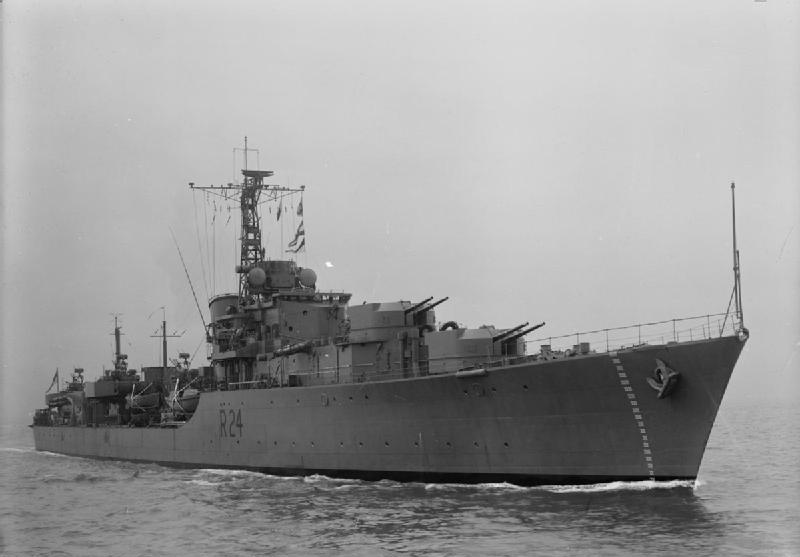

History

United Kingdom
- Name: HMS Gravelines
- Laid down: 10 August 1943
- Launched: 30 November 1944
- Completed: 14 June 1946
- Identification: Pennant number D24
- Fate: Sold for scrap 1961

General characteristics
- Class & type: Battle-class destroyer
- Displacement: 2,325 tons standard; 3,430 tons full load
- Length: 379 ft (116 m)
- Beam: 40 ft (12 m)
- Draught: 15.3 ft (4.7 m)
- Propulsion: 2 steam turbines, 2 shafts, 2 boilers, 50,000 shp (37 MW)
- Speed: 35.75 kn (66 km/h)
- Range: 4,400 nautical miles (8,100 km) at 12 knots (22 km/h)
- Complement: 268
- Armament: 2 × dual 4.5-inch (114 mm) gun; 1 × single 4-inch (102 mm) gun; 14 × Bofors 40 mm gun; 10 × 21 inch (533 mm) torpedo tubes; 1 × Squid mortar

HMS Gravelines was a Battle-class destroyer of the Royal Navy. She was named after the Battle of Gravelines, which took place in 1588, resulting in the English Navy defeating the Spanish Armada. Gravelines was built by Cammell Laird of Birkenhead. She was laid down on 10 August 1943, launched on 30 November 1944 and completed on 14 June 1946.

== Service ==
Upon commissioning, Gravelines was placed in reserve along with a number of her other sister-ships. In 1949, Gravelines joined the 3rd Destroyer Flotilla, which joined the Mediterranean Fleet. Gravelines exchanged crews with the destroyer St. Kitts on 10 March 1953 and returned to the UK where she was paid off into the reserve fleet.

In 1955, Gravelines, with the rest of the 3rd Flotilla, returned once again to the Mediterranean, and was in the area during the Suez Crisis, which had occurred in response to the Egyptian President Nasser's nationalisation of the Suez Canal. That same year, Gravelines returned to a colder climate, when she, along with the rest of the Flotilla, joined the Home Fleet, based in the UK. In 1957, Gravelines began a refit, though it was cancelled the following year. Gravelines arrived for scrapping at Rosyth on 4 April 1961.

== Publications ==
- Colledge, J. J.; Warlow, Ben (2006) [1969]. Ships of the Royal Navy: The Complete Record of All Fighting Ships of the Royal Navy from the 15th Century to the Present (3rd Rev ed.). London: Chatham Publishing. ISBN 978-1-86176-281-8. OCLC 67375475.
- Hodges, Peter (1971). Battle Class Destroyers. London: Almark Publishing. ISBN 0-85524-012-1.
