= HMS Albuera =

Battle-class destroyer

History

United Kingdom
- Name: HMS Albuera
- Builder: Vickers-Armstrongs, Newcastle on Tyne
- Laid down: 16 September 1943
- Launched: 28 August 1945
- Fate: Broken up incomplete 1950

General characteristics
- Class & type: Battle-class destroyer
- Displacement: 2,325 tons standard; 3,430 tons full load
- Length: 379 ft (116 m)
- Beam: 40 ft (12 m)
- Draught: 15.3 ft (4.7 m)
- Propulsion: 2 steam turbines, 2 shafts, 2 boilers, 50,000 shp (37 MW)
- Speed: 35.75 knots (66.21 km/h; 41.14 mph)
- Range: 4,400 nmi (8,100 km; 5,100 mi) at 12 knots (22 km/h; 14 mph)
- Complement: 268
- Armament: 2 × dual 4.5-inch (114 mm) gun; 1 × single 4-inch (102 mm) gun; 14 × Bofors 40 mm gun; 10 × 21 inch (533 mm) torpedo tubes; 1 × Squid mortar

HMS Albuera ( pennant number I51) was a Royal Navy Battle-class destroyer, ordered on 10 March 1943 from Vickers-Armstrongs on the Tyne. She was laid down on 16 September 1943 and launched on 28 August 1945. The order was cancelled on 15 October 1945 and she was sold incomplete for scrapping to Thos. W. Ward, arriving at Inverkeithing on 21 November 1950.
