= HMS Agincourt (D86) =

Battle-class destroyer

- HMS Agincourt underway

History

United Kingdom
- Name: HMS Agincourt
- Namesake: Battle of Agincourt
- Ordered: 1943
- Builder: Hawthorn Leslie and Company, Hebburn
- Yard number: 664
- Laid down: 12 December 1943
- Launched: 29 January 1945
- Completed: 25 June 1947
- Commissioned: 25 June 1947
- Decommissioned: 1972
- Fate: Broken up 1974

General characteristics
- Class & type: Battle-class destroyer
- Displacement: 2,480 tons standard
- Length: 379 ft (116 m)
- Beam: 40 ft 6 in (12.34 m)
- Draught: 12 ft 8 in (3.86 m) mean; 17 ft 6 in (5.33 m) maximum
- Propulsion: Oil fired, two three-drum boilers, Parsons geared turbines, twin screws, 50,000 hp (37 MW)
- Speed: 35.75 knots (66.21 km/h)
- Complement: 268
- Armament: Originally: 5 × 4.5-inch (114 mm) guns; 8 × Bofors 40 mm Automatic Gun L/60s; 10 × 21 inch (533 mm) torpedo tubes; 2 × Squid mortar; From 1959: Sea Cat missiles

Service record
- Part of: 4th Destroyer Flotilla; 4th Destroyer Squadron

HMS Agincourt (D86) was a later or 1943 Battle-class fleet destroyer of the Royal Navy. She was named in honour of the Battle of Agincourt, fought in 1415 during the Hundred Years' War. Agincourt was built by R. & W. Hawthorn, Leslie & Company Limited on the River Tyne. She was launched on 29 January 1945 and commissioned on 25 June 1947.

== Service ==
She joined the 4th Destroyer Flotilla, part of the Home Fleet based in the UK. On 23 June 1948, Agincourt collided with the naval Motor Fishing Vessel MFV 1161, breaking off a 3 ft (0.9 m) length of deck plating from the destroyer. In 1951, Agincourt became Captain (D), meaning she was the leader of the flotilla. On 14 July 1951, Agincourt was in collision with sister ship Cadiz. A 12 feet (3.7 m) length of planking was torn off from Agincourt's port side, while Cadiz's starboard anchor was damaged.

In 1953 Agincourt took part in the Fleet Review to celebrate the Coronation of Queen Elizabeth II. In December 1954, Agincourt, along with the rest of the squadron, formerly flotilla, deployed to the Mediterranean, where she was deployed until October 1955, when the Squadron returned to home waters. In 1956 Agincourt formed part of the Royal Navy force which took part in the Suez Crisis. In 1957, Agincourt, and the 4th Destroyer Squadron, returned to the Mediterranean.

== Refit and conversion to radar picket ==
In 1959, Agincourt and three of her sister-ships underwent conversion to become radar pickets. The conversion included the addition of the Sea Cat missile and new radar, as well as newer anti-aircraft weaponry. In 1962, Agincourt returned to active duty and saw service in the Home and Mediterranean Fleets with a variety of squadrons. On 16 November 1962 Agincourt took part in the search for a helicopter from the aircraft carrier Hermes that had ditched off St David's Head in South west Wales (and in particular, the politician Lord Windlesham who was missing after the crash), and on the next day, was refuelling at Milford Haven when she was ordered to go to the aid of the replenishment tanker RFA Green Ranger, which was in difficulty while being towed in heavy seas off Hartland Point on the coast of Devon. By the time Agincourt reached Hartland Point, Green Ranger's towline had parted, and the tanker had run aground. Agincourt illuminated Green Ranger with searchlights while the Appledore lifeboat attempted to rescue the seven men aboard Green Ranger, until they were taken off by Breeches buoy from the shore.

In 1966, Agincourt was reduced to Operational Reserve, and was subsequently placed on the disposal list in 1972. She was broken up in Sunderland in 1974.

== Commanding officers ==
List of commanding officers
From	To	Captain
1948	1949	Captain Ralph G Swallow RN
1949	1950	Captain Deric D E Holland RN
1951	1952	Captain Martin J Evans RN
1952	1954	Captain J Lee-Barber DSO RN
1954	1956	Captain Nicholas A Copeman RN
1956	1957	Captain Derick H F Hetherington RN
1957	1959	Captain Erroll N Sinclair RN
1959	1962	Under conversion
1962	1964	Commander Elgar RN
1964	1964	Commander D J Hallifax RN
1964	1966	Lieutenant-Commander C Grant RN

== Publications ==
- Colledge, J. J.; Warlow, Ben (2006) [1969]. Ships of the Royal Navy: The Complete Record of All Fighting Ships of the Royal Navy from the 15th Century to the Present (3rd Rev ed.). London: Chatham Publishing. ISBN 978-1-86176-281-8. OCLC 67375475.
- Critchley, Mike (1982). British Warships Since 1945: Part 3: Destroyers. Liskeard, UK: Maritime Books. ISBN 0-9506323-9-2.
- English, John (2008). Obdurate to Daring: British Fleet Destroyers 1941–45. Windsor, UK: World Ship Society. ISBN 978-0-9560769-0-8.
- Hodges, Peter (1971). Battle Class Destroyers. London: Almark Publishing. ISBN 0-85524-012-1.
