= HMS Aisne =

Battle-class destroyer

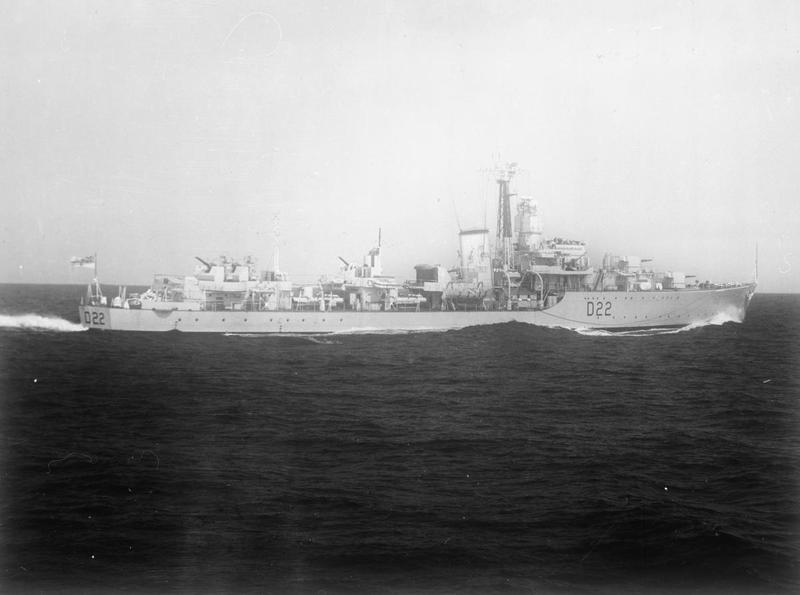
- HMS Aisne underway, c1955 (IWM FL 304)

History

United Kingdom
- Name: HMS Aisne
- Ordered: 1943
- Builder: Vickers-Armstrongs, High Walker
- Yard number: 74
- Laid down: 26 August 1943
- Launched: 12 May 1945
- Commissioned: 20 March 1947
- Decommissioned: 1968
- Fate: Broken up 1970

General characteristics
- Class & type: Battle-class destroyer
- Displacement: 2,480 tons standard
- Length: 379 ft (116 m)
- Beam: 40 ft 6 in (12.34 m)
- Draught: 12 ft 8 in (3.86 m) mean; 17 ft 6 in (5.33 m) maximum
- Propulsion: Oil fired, two three-drum boilers, Parsons geared turbines, twin screws, 50,000 hp (37 MW)
- Speed: 35.75 knots (66.21 km/h)
- Complement: 268
- Armament: Originally: 5 × 4.5-inch (114 mm) gun; 8 × Bofors 40 mm Automatic Gun L/60s; 10 × 21 inch (533 mm) torpedo tubes; 2 × Squid mortar; Later: Sea Cat missiles

Service record
- Part of: 4th Destroyer Squadron; 7th Destroyer Squadron; 23rd Escort Squadron; 30th Escort Squadron

HMS Aisne (D22) was a 1943 or later Battle-class fleet destroyer of the Royal Navy. She was named after one of the Battles of the Aisne.

Vickers-Armstrongs built Aisne at High Walker on the River Tyne. She was launched on 12 May 1945, the first warship since VE Day, and commissioned on 20 March 1947.

== Service history ==
Aisne joined the Home Fleet upon commission, but in 1950 she was temporarily laid-up. The following year, Aisne joined the 4th Destroyer Squadron, where she would subsequently have spells with the Home and Mediterranean Fleets. In 1953, Aisne took part in the Fleet Review at Spithead to celebrate the Coronation of HM Queen Elizabeth II. Aisne was positioned in the middle of her sister-ships HMS Corunna and HMS Barrosa.

In 1954, Aisne, as part of the 4th Destroyer Squadron, deployed to the Mediterranean, remaining there until 1955. In 1959, Aisne began a conversion to a Radar Picket, in effect extending the service life of Aisne, as well as those of the other converted ships, for just a little while longer than the rest of the class. The conversion gave her new radar, as well as the SeaCat missile system and new AA weaponry.

In 1962, Aisne joined the 7th Destroyer Squadron, and the following year joined the 23rd Escort Squadron, and subsequently the 30th Escort Squadron, deployed to the Mediterranean in 1964, before deploying to join the Far East Fleet. In 1967, Aisne deployed to the West Indies remaining there until the following year. In that same year, 1968, Aisne was decommissioned, and was then scrapped by ship breakers Thos. W. Ward at Inverkeithing in 1970.

== Publications ==
- Colledge, J. J.; Warlow, Ben (2006) [1969]. Ships of the Royal Navy: The Complete Record of All Fighting Ships of the Royal Navy from the 15th Century to the Present (3rd Rev ed.). London: Chatham Publishing. ISBN 978-1-86176-281-8. OCLC 67375475.
- Hodges, Peter (1971). Battle Class Destroyers. London: Almark Publishing. ISBN 0-85524-012-1.
