= HMS Vigo (D31) =

Battle-class destroyer

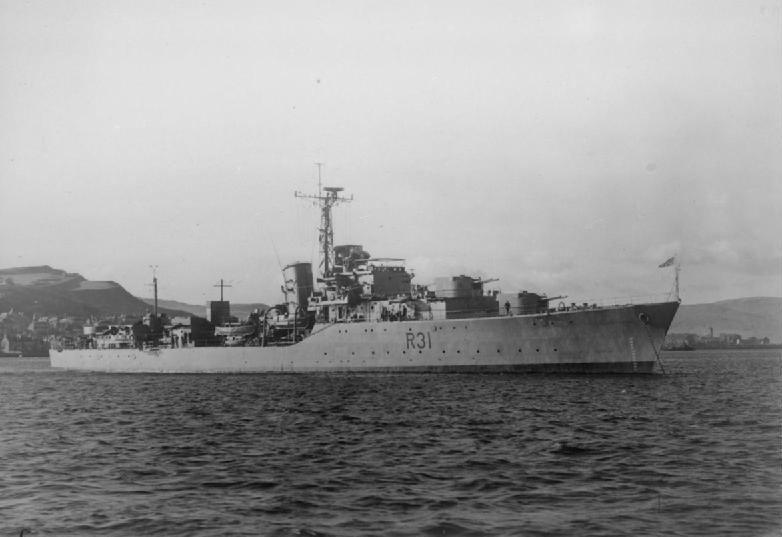
- HMS Vigo

History

United Kingdom
- Name: HMS Vigo
- Builder: Fairfield Shipbuilding and Engineering Company
- Laid down: 11 September 1943
- Launched: 27 September 1945
- Commissioned: 9 December 1946
- Decommissioned: 1 October 1959
- Identification: Pennant number D31
- Fate: Sold for breaking up

General characteristics
- Class & type: Battle-class destroyer
- Displacement: 2,325 tons
- Length: 379 ft (116 m)
- Beam: 40.25 ft (12.27 m)
- Propulsion: Boilers: 2 Admiralty, 3 drum type; Turbines: 2 Parsons; Horsepower: 50,000 shp (37 MW); Shafts: 2
- Speed: 34 knots (63 km/h)
- Complement: 247
- Armament: 2 × twin 4.5 in guns QF Mark III on mounting BD Mk. IV; 1 × single QF 4 inch naval gun Mk XXIII on mount Mk. III; 4 × twin 40 mm Bofors mounts "Hazemeyer" Mk. IV; 4-6 × single 40 mm Bofors mounts Mk. VII; 2 × quad tubes for 21 inch (533 mm) torpedoes Mk. IX; Two depth charge rails.; Four depth charge throwers.; Depth charges later replaced by 1 × Squid A/S mortar

HMS Vigo was a Battle-class destroyer of the Royal Navy. She was named after the Battle of Vigo, which took place in 1702 during the War of Spanish Succession between a British-Dutch Fleet and the French, and which ended in a victory for the British. Vigo was built by Fairfield Shipbuilding and Engineering Company of Govan. She was launched on 27 September 1945 and commissioned on 9 December 1946.

== Service history ==
Upon commissioning, Vigo was placed in Reserve along with a number of her sister-ships. In 1949, Vigo joined the 3rd Destroyer Flotilla, based in the Mediterranean, which at that time, had quite a large Royal Navy presence. She performed a variety of operations there, at a time when there was much going on in the region and nearby, such as the internal turmoil in Egypt between 1951–1954.

In 1953, while still in the Mediterranean, Vigo suffered a fire onboard her, causing minor damage, though Vigo would suffer another fire in 1954. Also that year, Vigo became the Gunnery Training Ship based at Portsmouth, a duty that a number of her sister ships also performed.

In addition to being the Gunnery Training Ship to HMS Excellent, at Whale Island, Vigo was also Captain (D) of the Portsmouth Squadron.

As well as her Gunnery duties, during the period 1958–59, Vigo also carried out two Icelandic patrols during the first Cod War; took part in NATO exercises, and visited such ports as Vigo, Cuxhaven, Caen and Den Helder, before being paid off in September, 1959, having been relieved as Captain (D) by Wakeful around 17 August 1959. By this date her hull was considered to be beyond economic repair. Her last commanding officer, Captain Michael Pollock, went on to become an Admiral of the Fleet.

== Disposal ==
Following decommissioning in 1959, she was finally scrapped in 1964 at Faslane.
