= HMS Sluys =

Battle-class destroyer

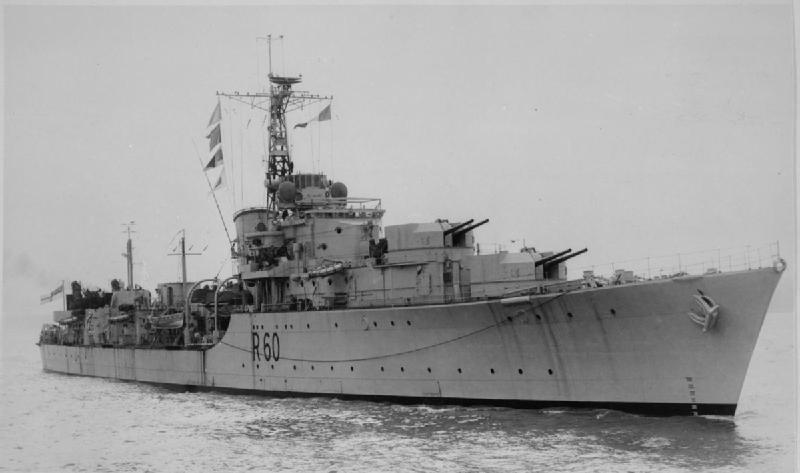
- HMS Sluys underway on the River Mersey, 1946

History

United Kingdom
- Name: Sluys
- Namesake: Battle of Sluys
- Builder: Cammell Laird & Co, Birkenhead
- Laid down: 24 November 1943
- Launched: 28 February 1945
- Completed: 30 September 1946
- Commissioned: 30 September 1946
- Decommissioned: 1953
- Identification: Pennant number D60
- Fate: Sold to Pahlavi Iran 1967

Iran
- Name: Artemiz
- Namesake: Artemis, Mount Damavand
- Acquired: 26 January 1967
- Renamed: Damavand in 1985
- Stricken: 1996
- Identification: 51/D 5
- Fate: non-operational since 1990

General characteristics (as built)
- Class & type: Battle-class destroyer
- Displacement: 2,325 long tons (2,362 t) standard; 3,360 long tons (3,410 t) full load (1975)
- Length: 355 feet (108 m) p/p; 379 feet (116 m) overall
- Beam: 45.5 feet (13.9 m)
- Draught: 17.5 feet (5.3 m)
- Propulsion: 2 steam turbines, 2 shafts, 2 boilers, 50,000 shp (37 MW)
- Speed: 35.5 knots (65.7 km/h; 40.9 mph), 31 knots (57 km/h; 36 mph) sustained sea
- Range: 3,000 miles (4,800 km) at 20 knots (37 km/h; 23 mph)
- Complement: 270
- Armament: 2 × dual 4.5-inch (114 mm) gun; 1 × single 4-inch (102 mm) gun; 14 × Bofors 40 mm gun; 10 × 21 inch (533 mm) torpedo tubes; 1 × Squid mortar

HMS Sluys was a Battle-class destroyer of the Royal Navy (RN). She was named in honour of the Battle of Sluys which occurred in 1340 during the Hundred Years' War, and which resulted in a decisive English victory over a French fleet. Sluys was built by Cammell Laird of Birkenhead. She was launched on 28 February 1945 and commissioned on 30 September 1946. In 1967, the ship was transferred to Pahlavi Iran and renamed Artemiz. In 1985, the ship was renamed again, this time Damavand.

== Royal Navy service ==
Upon commission, Sluys joined the 5th Destroyer Flotilla, part of the Home Fleet, which was based in the UK. In 1947, Sluys, along with her sister ship Cadiz, escorted the aircraft carrier Vengeance, which was flying the flag of the First Sea Lord, to Norway, where the small group made a variety of fly-the-flag visits to ports, as well as performing other duties.

In 1953, Sluys was decommissioned and subsequently placed in Reserve.

== Transfer and sale to Iran ==
Sluys was sold to Pahlavi Iran in 1967 after a major rebuild by Vosper Thornycroft of Southampton that took three years to complete, completely changing her outline. This resulted in the ship having a fully enclosed bridge and a revised anti-aircraft fit of four single 40mm Bofors guns and a quadruple Sea Cat missile system. A new plated mainmast carried a Plessey AWS 1 long range search radar. The sale was made despite stresses between the UK and Iran during the 1960s, which were centred on tensions and disputes in the Middle East. Sluys was renamed Artemiz upon joining the Iranian Navy. After some time, the ship was awarded the pennant number 51.

On 30 November 1971, Artemiz took part in the Iranian occupation of the Tunb islands in the Strait of Hormuz. In 1975-76, Artemiz underwent another refit, this time taking place at Cape Town, South Africa. The destroyer received four Standard missile launchers with a launch capability of eight missiles.

In 1985 Artemiz underwent a further refit, this time carried out by the Russians and received, amongst other things, a brand new Russian surface-to-air missile system to replace the British Sea Cat. However, she did keep her original 4.5-inch Mk 4 turrets, albeit with an updated radar and fire control system. The ship was then renamed Damavand and also received two Soviet-made twin 23 mm/80 anti-aircraft guns.

Damavand was stricken around 1996

== See also ==
- Current Iranian Navy vessels

== Publications ==
- Colledge, J. J.; Warlow, Ben (2006) [1969]. Ships of the Royal Navy: The Complete Record of All Fighting Ships of the Royal Navy from the 15th Century to the Present (3rd Rev ed.). London: Chatham Publishing. ISBN 978-1-86176-281-8. OCLC 67375475.
- Gardiner, Robert; Chumbley, Stephen; Budzbon, Przemysław, eds. (1995). Conway's All the World's Fighting Ships 1947-1995. Annapolis, Maryland: Naval Institute Press. ISBN 1-55750-132-7.
- Hodges, Peter (1971). Battle Class Destroyers. London: Almark Publishing. ISBN 0-85524-012-1.
- Marriott, Leo (1989). Royal Navy Destroyers Since 1945. Ian Allan Ltd. ISBN 0-7110-1817-0.
