= HMS Saintes =

Battle-class destroyer

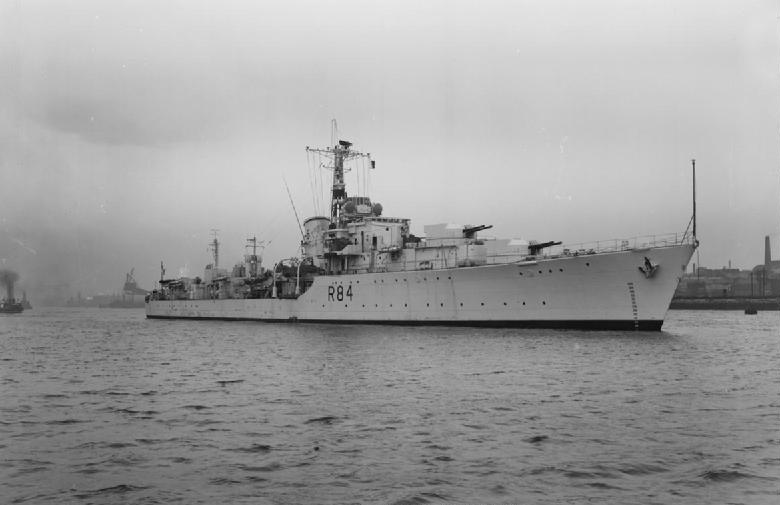
- HMS Saintes

History

United Kingdom
- Name: HMS Saintes
- Ordered: 1942
- Builder: Hawthorn Leslie and Company
- Laid down: 8 June 1943
- Launched: 19 July 1944
- Commissioned: 27 September 1946
- Decommissioned: May 1962
- Fate: Broken up at Cairn Ryan 1972

General characteristics
- Class & type: Battle-class destroyer
- Displacement: 2,325 tons
- Length: 379 ft (116 m)
- Beam: 40.25 ft (12.27 m)
- Draught: 13 ft (4.0 m)
- Propulsion: 2-shaft geared turbines; 50,000 shp (37 MW)
- Speed: 32 knots (59 km/h)+
- Complement: 247
- Armament: Final configuration: 4 × 4.5 in (114 mm) guns (2 twin Mk4 turrets); Bofors 40 mm (5 single Mk7, 2 twin Mk5); 8 21 inch (533 mm) torpedo tubes (2 x 4); 1 triple barrel Squid depth charge mortar

HMS Saintes was a 1942 Battle-class fleet destroyer of the Royal Navy (RN). She and 15 sister ships being ordered under the 1942 defence estimates. The ship was named after the Battle of the Saintes, a Royal Navy victory over a French fleet intending to invade Jamaica in 1782. So far she has been the only ship of the Royal Navy to bear the name. Saintes was built by Hawthorn Leslie and Company on the Tyne. The vessel was launched on 19 July 1944 and commissioned on 27 September 1946.

== Royal Navy service ==
When Saintes first commissioned in 1946 she joined the 5th Destroyer Flotilla and was used to trial the new 4.5-inch Mk 6 twin turret which became the standard destroyer main armament until well into the 1970s.

Saintes paid off on completion of the trials and was refitted with the conventional main armament of the class. In 1949, Saintes recommissioned into the 3rd Destroyer Flotilla and deployed to the Mediterranean where she took over as Captain (D)3, the senior officer in command of the flotilla.

In March 1954, whilst still in the Mediterranean, Saintes came to the assistance of the British troopship Empire Windrush, which had suffered an engine room explosion and fire whilst carrying troops and their families home from Japan. Saintes reached Windrush after the passengers and crew had been rescued by other ships, put fire and towing parties aboard and attempted to tow Windrush to Gibraltar but the ship foundered whilst under tow. Apart from the four engine room staff killed in the original explosion all crew and passengers were rescued unharmed.

Saintes remained Captain of the 3rd Destroyer Squadron until she went for a major refit in 1956 at Rosyth when her crew transferred to her sister ship Armada. On completion of her refit in 1958, Saintes again took over as Captain of the Squadron, this time as part of a General Service commission spending a part of the time with the Home Fleet and part of the time with the Mediterranean Fleet. In 1960, Saintes recommissioned with the 1st Destroyer Squadron, again having spells with the Home and Mediterranean Fleets.

== Decommissioning and disposal ==
Saintes was paid off in May 1962 at Devonport. The ship was then towed to Rosyth by a towing crew of volunteers from her last commission. At Rosyth Saintes became the training ship for Artificer Apprentices from the shore establishment Caledonia. Her armament was mothballed but her engines were maintained in full working order by the trainees. Saintes was broken up at Cairn Ryan in 1972.

== Publications ==
- Colledge, J. J.; Warlow, Ben (2006) [1969]. Ships of the Royal Navy: The Complete Record of All Fighting Ships of the Royal Navy from the 15th Century to the Present (3rd Rev ed.). London: Chatham Publishing. ISBN 978-1-86176-281-8. OCLC 67375475.
- Hodges, Peter (1971). Battle Class Destroyers. London: Almark Publishing. ISBN 0-85524-012-1.
- Marriott, Leo (1989). Royal Navy Destroyers Since 1945. Ian Allan Ltd.
