= HMS Jutland (D62) =

Battle-class destroyer

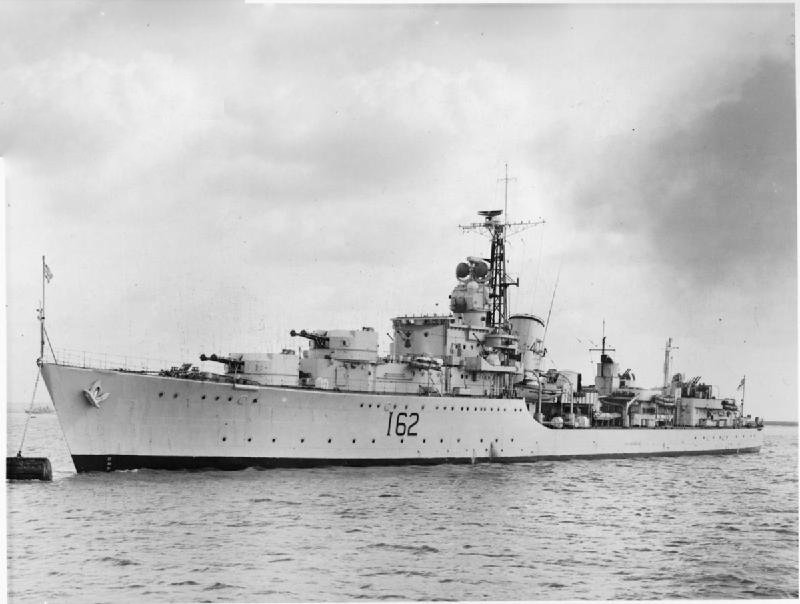

History

United Kingdom
- Name: HMS Jutland
- Ordered: 1943
- Laid down: 1945
- Launched: 20 February 1946
- Commissioned: 30 July 1947
- Fate: Broken up 1965

General characteristics
- Class & type: Battle-class destroyer
- Displacement: 2,480 tons standard
- Length: 379 ft (116 m)
- Beam: 40 ft 6 in (12.34 m)
- Draught: 12 ft 8 in (3.86 m) mean; 17 ft 6 in (5.33 m) maximum
- Propulsion: Oil fired, two three-drum boilers, Parsons geared turbines, twin propellers, 50,000 hp (37,285 kW)
- Speed: 35.75 knots (66.21 km/h)
- Complement: 268
- Armament: 5 × 4.5-inch (114 mm) gun; 8 × Bofors 40 mm guns; 10 × 21 inch (533 mm) torpedo tubes; 1 × Squid mortar

Service record
- Part of: 4th Destroyer Squadron; 7th Destroyer Squadron

HMS Jutland (D62) was a later or 1943 Battle-class fleet destroyer of the United Kingdom's Royal Navy. She was named after the Battle of Jutland, the largest naval battle of the First World War. The first Jutland was launched in 1945, but was cancelled that same year. Her sister ship, Malplaquet - named after a battle between Britain and France during the War of the Spanish Succession in 1709 - was renamed Jutland just prior to her launch on 20 February 1946, and was commissioned on 30 July 1947. The original Jutland was finally broken up in 1957 at Rosyth.

== Service ==
In April 1947 she was assigned to the 4th Destroyer Flotilla of the Home Fleet, September 1948, Jutland, in company with the two aircraft carriers HMS Theseus and HMS Vengeance, as well as two of her sister ships and a frigate, deployed on a cruise mainly to South Africa, visiting a number of ports on the way. After the group's visit to South Africa, they performed a number of naval exercises before returning to the UK in December.

In April 1950 Jutland was temporarily laid-up, but the following year she returned to active service, seeing service with the Home and Mediterranean Fleets. In 1952, as part of the 4th Destroyer Squadron, Jutland visited the Middle East, during the troubles in Egypt. In 1953 she took part in the Fleet Review to celebrate the Coronation of Queen Elizabeth II and was subsequently placed in Reserve, along with a number of her sister ships. In 1957, Jutland joined the Home and subsequently the Mediterranean Fleets as part of the 7th Destroyer Squadron. The following year, during a daytime exercise off Malta, Jutland collided with her sister ship HMS Dunkirk, causing minor damage.

== Decommissioning and disposal ==
In 1961 Jutland was placed in reserve. She was subsequently placed on the disposal list and broken up at Faslane in 1965.

== Publications ==
- Colledge, J. J.; Warlow, Ben (2006) [1969]. Ships of the Royal Navy: The Complete Record of All Fighting Ships of the Royal Navy from the 15th Century to the Present (3rd Rev ed.). London: Chatham Publishing. ISBN 978-1-86176-281-8. OCLC 67375475.
- Hodges, Peter (1971). Battle Class Destroyers. London: Almark Publishing. ISBN 0-85524-012-1.
