= HMS Delight (D119) =

Daring-class destroyer

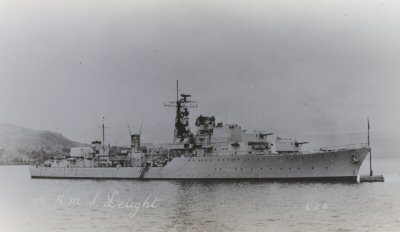
- HMS Delight

History

United Kingdom
- Name: HMS Delight
- Ordered: 5 June 1943
- Builder: Fairfield Shipbuilding and Engineering Company
- Laid down: 5 September 1946
- Launched: 21 December 1950
- Motto: Duris delectat virtus; ("Valour delighteth in difficulties")
- Fate: Scrapped 1971
- Badge: On a Field Green, Pan's Pipe Gold and Silver

General characteristics
- Class & type: Daring-class destroyer
- Displacement: Standard: 2,830 tons, Full load: 3,820 tons
- Length: 390 ft (120 m)
- Beam: 43 ft (13 m)
- Draught: 13.6 ft (4.1 m)
- Propulsion: 2 Foster Wheeler boilers (650 psi, 850 °F), Parsons steam turbines, 2 shafts, 54,000 shp (40 MW)
- Speed: 30 knots (56 km/h)
- Range: 4,400 nautical miles (8,100 km) at 20 knots (37 km/h)
- Complement: Approximately 300
- Sensors & processing systems: Radar Type 293Q target indication; Radar Type 291 air warning; Radar Type 274 navigation; Radar Type 275 fire control on director Mk.VI; Radar Type 262 fire control on director CRBF and STAAG Mk.II
- Armament: 6 QF 4.5 in /45 (114 mm) Mark V in 3 twin mountings UD Mark VI; 4 40 mm /60 Bofors A/A in 2 twin mounts STAAG Mk.II; 2 40 mm /60 Bofors A/A in 1 twin mount Mk.V; 2 pentad tubes for 21 inch (533 mm) torpedoes Mk.IX; 1 Squid anti submarine mortar

HMS Delight was a Daring-class destroyer of the British Royal Navy, launched in 1950 as the Royal Navy's first all-welded warship, and broken up at Inverkeithing in 1971.

== Service history ==
In 1956 she formed part of the Royal Navy's force used during the Suez Operation. In 1959 Delight was involved in a collision in the Mediterranean with the cruiser Birmingham. Two ratings died during damage control activities.

== Publications ==
- Colledge, J. J.; Warlow, Ben (2006) [1969]. Ships of the Royal Navy: The Complete Record of All Fighting Ships of the Royal Navy from the 15th Century to the Present (3rd Rev ed.). London: Chatham Publishing. ISBN 978-1-86176-281-8. OCLC 67375475.
- McCart, Neil (2008). Daring Class Destroyers. Fan Publications. ISBN 978-1-904459-33-0.
