= R. & W. Hawthorn, Leslie and Company =

Shipbuilder and locomotive manufacturer

R. & W. Hawthorn, Leslie & Company
- Type: Public
- Industry: Locomotive manufacturing Shipbuilding
- Founded: 1886
- Defunct: 1993
- Fate: Acquired
- Successor: Vodafone
- Headquarters: Hebburn, UK

R. & W. Hawthorn, Leslie and Company, Limited, usually referred to as Hawthorn Leslie, was a shipbuilder and locomotive manufacturer. The company was founded on Tyneside in 1886 and ceased building ships in 1982.

== History ==
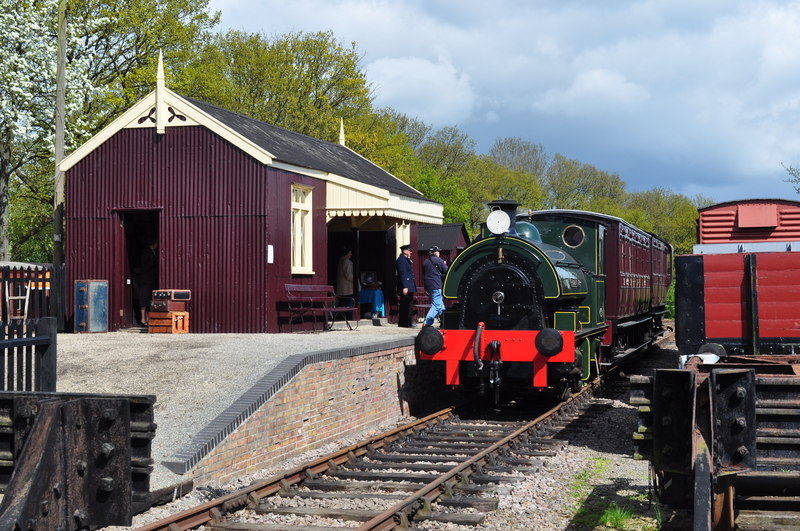
Falmouth Docks number 3 in steam at the Mid-Suffolk Light Railway

The company was formed by the merger of the shipbuilder A. Leslie and Company in Hebburn with the locomotive works of R and W Hawthorn at St. Peter's in Newcastle upon Tyne in 1886. In 1904, at their St Peters works they began building Parsons turbine engines for ships. The company displaced its locomotive manufacturing interests in 1937 to Robert Stephenson and Company, which became Robert Stephenson and Hawthorns Ltd.

Perhaps the most famous ship built by the Company was HMS Kelly, launched in 1938 and commanded by Lord Louis Mountbatten. In 1954, the shipbuilding and marine engine activities were put into separate subsidiaries, Hawthorn Leslie (Shipbuilders) Ltd. and Hawthorn Leslie (Engineers) Ltd. In 1968 the Company's shipbuilding interests were merged with that of Swan Hunter and the Vickers Naval Yard to create Swan Hunter & Tyne Shipbuilders.

The company's shipbuilding and marine engineering interests were both nationalised and subsumed with British Shipbuilders in 1977; in 1979 its engine business was merged with George Clark & NEM, which had also been nationalised, to form Clark Hawthorn.

The company's main shipbuilding yard at Hebburn closed in 1982, was sold to Cammell Laird and then acquired by A&P Group in 2001 but has been acquired by developers in 2018 who have secured a planning consent for 446 new homes and construction of Phase 1 has now commenced. The Company itself, deprived of its main activity, diversified into telephones. In March 1993, Vodafone made a bid for the Company which by then had become a mobile phone air time reseller.

The Hawthorn Leslie building still standing in Hebburn has been the target of numerous arson attacks in recent years. This, combined with the presence of asbestos in the brickwork and the ease of access to children, has led to repeated calls from Hebburn residents and councillors for the building to be demolished. Developers Hebburn Riverside Development Limited have fully demolished and remediated the site and commenced construction of the first phase of housing.

== Locomotives ==
After the merger the locomotive side continued manufacturing for main line, light and industrial railways, including a large number built for export, usually to the designs of the Crown Agents.

=== Designs ===
Steam

The company manufactured locomotives to order for main line companies. Four 0-4-4T locomotives were supplied to the Metropolitan Railway between 1896 and 1901. In 1915, F. G. Smith of the Highland Railway ordered six 4-6-0s to his own designs. However they were rejected by that railway as being too heavy, they were taken over by the Caledonian Railway. The London and North Eastern Railway ordered a batch of Great Central designed locomotives from the Company in 1925/6.

In addition it built locomotives to its own designs such as a 4-2-2-0 with four cylinders - two inside and two outside - connected separately to the two pairs of driving wheels. It was produced for the Chicago World's Fair of 1893 but could not produce sufficient steam to compete effectively with the American products.

The company later had a number of standard designs including 0-4-0STs and fireless locomotives.

- Two 2-4-0 locomotives were supplied to the Kent and East Sussex Railway in 1899. Owned by the Rother Valley Railway and/or the Kent & East Sussex Light Railway.

Origin	Wheel arrangement	Class	Notes	Photograph
Hawthorn Leslie	2-4-0T		No. 1 Tenterden. Works number 2420/1899. Bought new for the opening of the line. Withdrawn for overhaul in 1938, scrapped in 1941.	
Hawthorn Leslie	2-4-0T		No. 2 Northiam. Works number 2421/1899. Bought new for the opening of the line. Loaned in 1917 to the Weston, Clevedon and Portishead Railway, returned in 1918. Loaned in 1923 to the East Kent Light Railway, returned in 1930. In 1937, Northiam starred in Oh, Mr Porter!, filmed on the Basingstoke and Alton Light Railway. Last ran on 22 August 1938 and scrapped in 1941.	

- In 1908, an 0-6-0T and two 0-6-2T locomotives were supplied to the Plymouth, Devonport and South Western Junction Railway,

PD&SWJR no.	Name	LSWR number	Wheel arrangement	Driving wheels	Cylinders	Boiler pressure	Notes
3	A. S. Harris	756	0-6-0T	3 ft 10 in	14" x 22"	170 psi	
4	Earl of Mount Edgcumbe	757	0-6-2T	4 ft 0 in	16" x 24"	170 psi	
5	Lord St Levan	758	0-6-2T	4 ft 0 in	16" x 24"	170 psi	

- Hawthorn Leslie 0-8-0T Built 1906, and became K&ESR, No. 4 and named "Hecate," The locomotive was an outside cylindered 0-8-0 side tank engine with a short wheelbase and flangeless driven wheels to cope with the sharp curves expected on the new line. With 16 in by 24 in cylinders and 4 ft 3 in diameter driving wheels, its tractive effort was 16,385 lb, more than twice that of the line's other locomotives and sufficient to take trains over the 1 in 40 gradients of the North Downs crossing. The engine was painted dark blue and lined in red, with a copper cap to the chimney and a polished brass dome. Eventually, in 1932 they exchanged "Hecate" for an older LSWR "Saddleback" and two spare boilers from the Southern Railway (SR). This was a good bargain on the SR's part, as they repainted "Hecate" (keeping the name), numbered it 949, and sent it to Nine Elms, where it worked almost daily on shunting duties until eventual scrapping in 1950.
- Two Hawthorn Leslie 0-6-2T locomotives were supplied to the Shropshire and Montgomeryshire Railway in 1911. Named Pyramus and Thisbe, these seem not to have been a success, and soon departed, one of them to the Longmoor Military Railway in Hampshire.
- Hawthorn Leslie built 27, A class 0-6-2T steam tank locomotives designed by J. Cameron and introduced to the Taff Vale Railway in 1914.

List of TVR A class locomotive orders
Year	Quantity	Manufacturer	Works Numbers	TVR Numbers	GWR Numbers	Notes
1914	6	Hawthorn Leslie	3057–3062	3, 7, 10, 11, 12, 120	438, 335, 337, 343, 344, 441	441 renumbered 322 in 1947, 438 renumbered 309 sometime between 1948 and 1950
1920	16	Hawthorn Leslie	3394–3409	20, 134, 144, 149, 162, 164, 165, 400 to 408	345, 368, 375, 376, 383 to 391, 393, 394, 397	
1921	5	Hawthorn Leslie	3410–3414	409 to 413	398, 399, 401 to 403	401 and 403 renumbered 303 and 305 in 1947, 402 renumbered 304 sometime between 1948 and 1950

- Hawthorn Leslie built two 0-6-0T locomotives for the Port of London Authority docks railway in 1922. Works numbers 3529 and 3530.

Diesel

Hawthorn Leslie, in collaboration with the English Electric Company, built diesel shunting locomotives for the London, Midland and Scottish Railway in the 1930s. This design formed the basis for the later British Rail Class 08 diesel shunter.

Electric

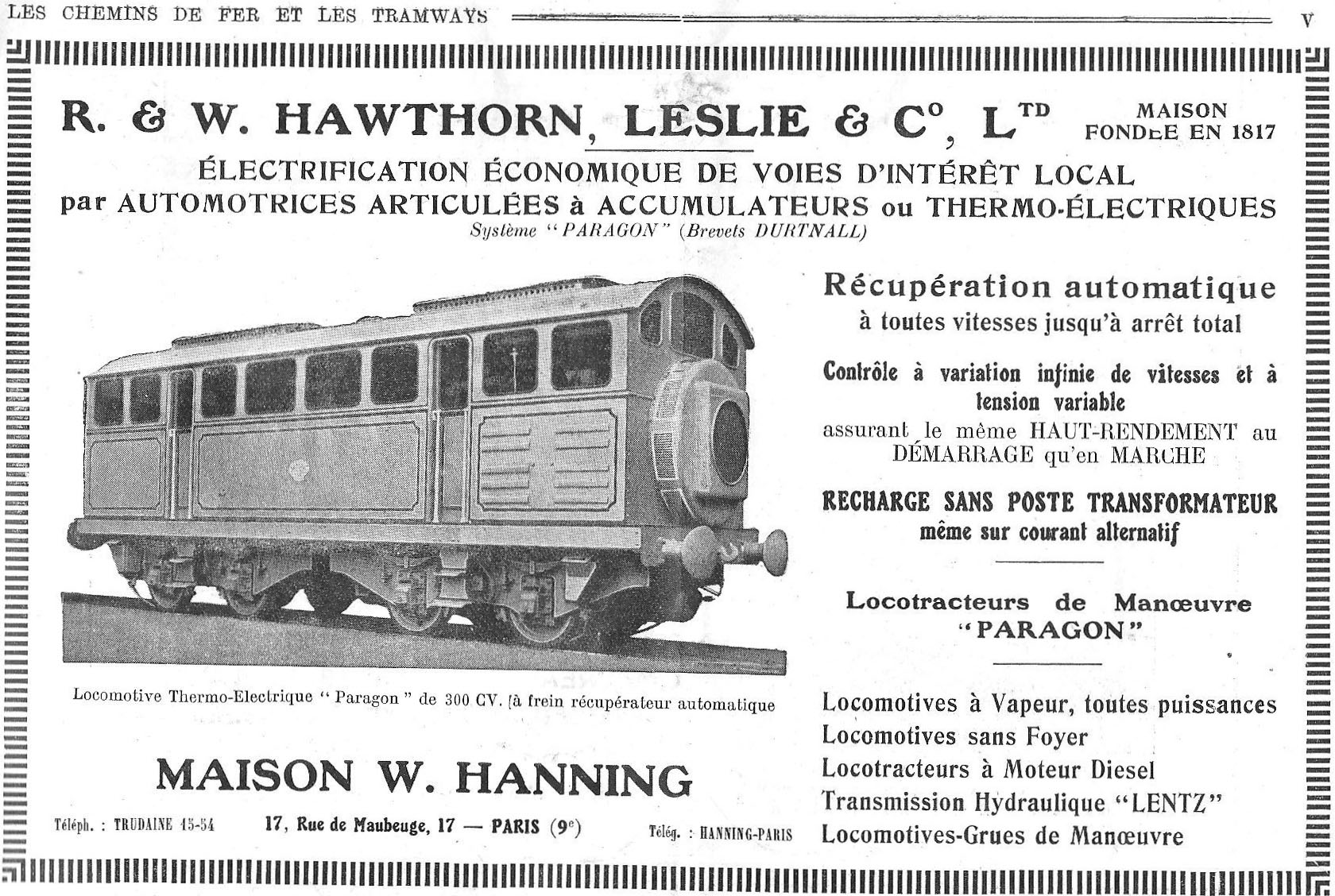
Electric battery locomotives in advertisement

Hawthorn Leslie, and its successor Robert Stephenson and Hawthorns, built four electric locomotives for Kearsley power station between 1928 and 1946 and three of these still exist. No. 2 has been converted to battery operation and is in use at Heysham nuclear power station. Nos. 1 and 3 are preserved, see below.

=== Preserved locomotives ===
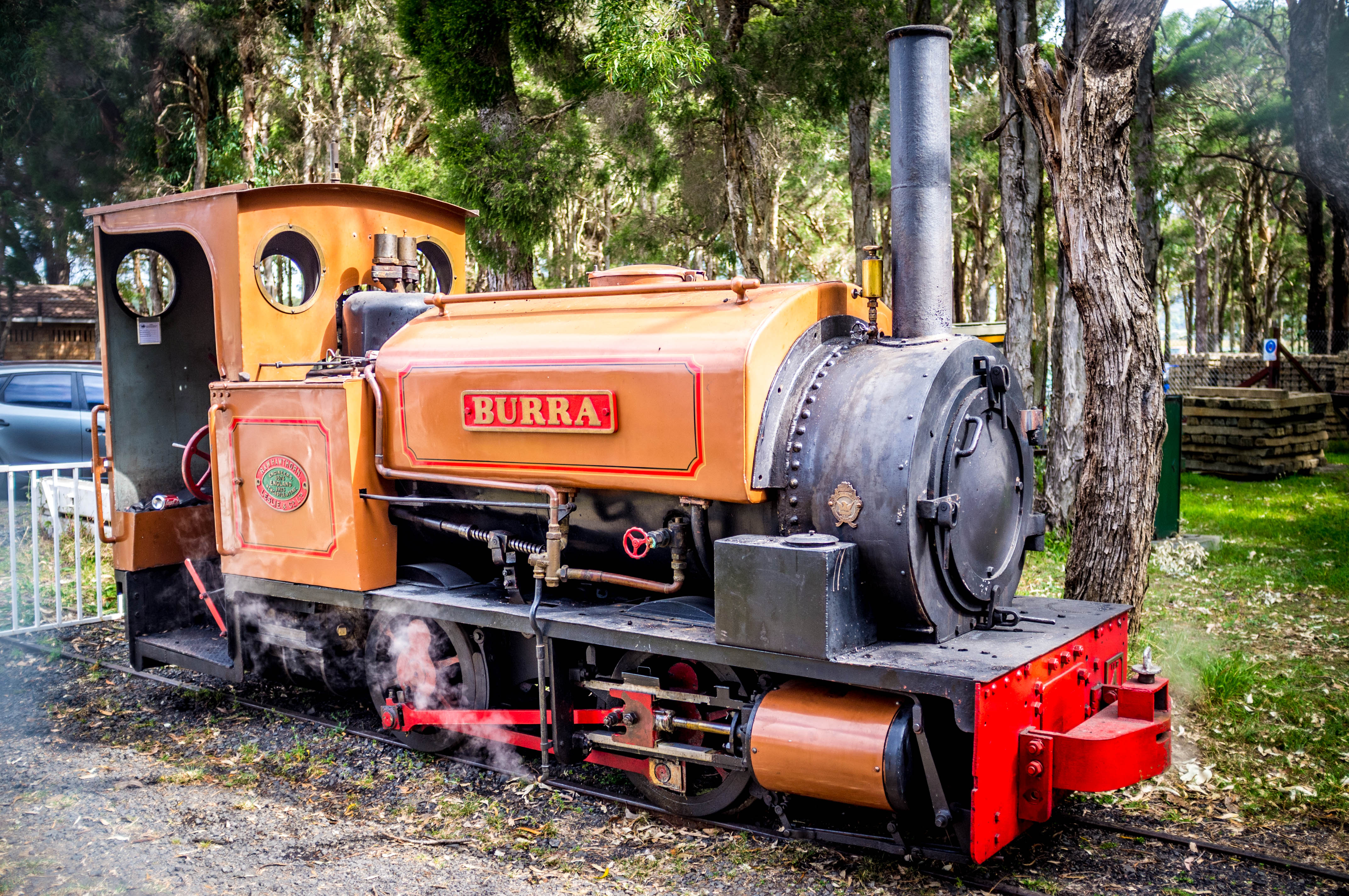
Burra (short for Kookaburra) was ordered by Corrimal Colliery on 1 May 1923

Steam

28 Hawthorn Leslie Tank Engines are in preservation today:

- Hawthorn Leslie 0-4-0ST Wn2450 Built 1899 Commander B (formerly Newcastle) awaiting overhaul at the Hollycombe Steam Collection
- Hawthorn Leslie 0-4-0ST Wn2491 Built 1901 Henry at the Barrow Hill Engine Shed
- Hawthorn Leslie 0-4-0ST Wn2711 Built 1907 Cyclops at the Tanfield Railway
- Hawthorn Leslie 0-4-0ST Wn2780 Built 1909 Asbestos (On display) at the Chasewater Railway
- Hawthorn Leslie 0-4-0ST Wn2800 Built 1909 Met
- Hawthorn Leslie 0-4-0ST Wn2859 Built 1911 No.2 Ex Keighley Corporation Gas Dept. at the Tanfield Railway
- Hawthorn Leslie 0-4-0ST Wn2928 Built 1912 Pony also known as Achilles at the Chatham Historic Dockyard
- Hawthorn Leslie 0-4-0ST Wn2988 Built 1913 Wallaby at the Illawarra Light Railway Museum NSW
- Hawthorn Leslie 0-4-0ST Wn3056 Built 1914 NCB No.14 at the Tanfield Railway
- Hawthorn Leslie 0-4-0ST Wn3135 Built 1915 Invincible 37 at the Isle of Wight Steam Railway
- Hawthorn Leslie 0-6-0ST Wn3138 Built 1915 Holwell No.14 Dismantled, awaiting restoration. Ex Goodman Bros, at the Rutland Railway Museum
- Hawthorn Leslie 0-4-0ST Wn3240 Built 1917 Beatty No.139 at the Telford Steam Railway
- Hawthorn Leslie 0-6-0ST Wn3437 Built 1919 Isabel operational at the Epping Ongar Railway
- Hawthorn Leslie 0-6-0ST Wn3513 Built 1927 NCB STAGSHAW at the Telford Steam Railway
- Hawthorn Leslie 0-4-0ST Wn3574 Built 1923 Burra operational at the Illawarra Light Railway Museum NSW
- Hawthorn Leslie 0-6-0ST Wn3575 Built 1923 GLASSHOUGHTON No.3 at the Tanfield Railway
- Hawthorn Leslie 0-4-0ST Wn3581 Built 1924 Thompson & Evershed No. 3 Foxfield Railway
- Hawthorn Leslie 0-4-0ST Wn3640 Built 1926 Lord King at the SRPS Bo'ness and Kinneil Railway
- Hawthorn Leslie 0-4-0ST Wn3732 Built 1928 No.13 or The Barra at the Tanfield Railway
- Hawthorn Leslie 0-4-0ST Wn3715 Built 1928 Associated Portland Cement at Swanscombe No.1 at the Colne Valley Railway
- Hawthorn Leslie 0-4-0ST Wn3717 Built 1928 Associated Portland Cement at Swanscombe No.3 at the Buckinghamshire Railway Centre
- Hawthorn Leslie 0-4-0ST Wn3718 Built 1928 Associated Portland Cement at Swanscombe No.4 at the Buckinghamshire Railway Centre
- Hawthorn Leslie 0-4-0ST Wn3799 Built 1935 Penicuik at the Aln Valley Railway
- Hawthorn Leslie 0-6-0ST Wn3827 Built 1934 ex-Corby Iron & Steel Works No. 14 at the East Carlton Country Park
- Hawthorn Leslie 0-6-0ST Wn3837 Built 1934 ex-Corby Iron & Steel Works No. 16 at the Epping Ongar Railway
- Hawthorn Leslie 0-4-0ST Wn3860 Built 1935 Associated Portland Cement Manufacturers, Swanscombe, No.6 at the Middleton Railway
- Hawthorn Leslie 0-4-0ST Wn3865 Built 1936 Singapore Ex HM Dockyards Chatham, at the Rutland Railway Museum
- Hawthorn Leslie 0-6-0ST Wn3931 Built 1938 Linda Returned to steam in May 2015. Cambrian Heritage Railways

Fireless

- Hawthorn Leslie 0-6-0F Wn3746 Built 1929 HUNCOAT No.3 at the Tanfield Railway
- Hawthorn Leslie 0-4-0F Wn3858 Built 1935 Tugela Colenso - Municipal Offices, SA/

Diesel

- Hawthorn Leslie 0-6-0DE Wn???? Built 1935 LMS diesel shunter no. 7069 at the Berkeley Vale Railway

Electric

Two of the Kearsley power station locomotives (see above) are preserved. No. 1 at the Electric Railway Museum, Warwickshire and no. 3 at the Tanfield Railway.

== Shipbuilding ==
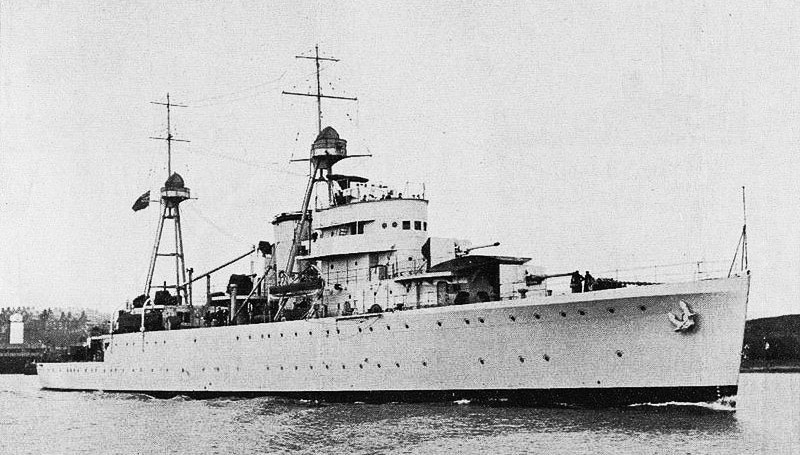
NRP Afonso de Albuquerque of the Portuguese Navy in 1935, built by Hawthorn Leslie in 1934.

Ships built by Hawthorn Leslie included:

Aircraft carriers

- HMS Triumph

Cruisers

- HMS Calypso
- HMS Carysfort
- HMS Champion
- HMS Cleopatra
- HMS Manchester
- HMS Naiad
- HMS Sussex

Frigates

- HMS Argonaut
- NRP Afonso de Albuquerque

Destroyers

- HMS Active
- HMS Agincourt
- HMS Alamein
- HMS Antelope
- HMS Armada
- HMS Blean
- HMS Boadicea
- HMS Boyne
- HMS Cheerful
- HMS Derwent
- HMS Doon
- HMS Eden
- HMS Electra
- HMS Encounter
- HMS Greyhound
- HMS Imogen
- HMS Imperial
- HMS Jackal
- HMS Jervis
- HMS Kale
- HMS Kelly
- HMS Legion
- HMS Lightning
- HMS Mansfield
- HMS Marksman
- HMS Mentor
- HMS Montrose
- HMS Pathfinder
- HMS Pigeon
- HMS Plover
- HMS Quail
- HMS Quilliam
- HMS Saintes
- HMS Sarpedon
- HMS Scourge
- HMS Starfish
- HMS Stork
- HMS Stuart
- HMS Talisman
- HMS Tenedos
- HMS Termagant
- HMS Thanet
- HMS Thisbe
- HMS Thracian
- HMS Thruster
- HMS Tigress
- HMS Trident
- HMS Turbulent
- HMS Verdun
- HMS Versatile
- HMS Verulam
- HMS Warwick
- HMS Waveney
- HMS Zulu

Royal Fleet Auxiliary

- RFA Sir Bedivere
- RFA Sir Tristram
- RFA Olwen
- RFA Olna
- RFA Echodale
- RFA Tidespring
- RFA Tidepool

Merchant ships

- SS Antenor
- SS Barneson
- MV Beacon Grange
- SS Boniface
- MV British Venture
- SS Cass
- MV Daronia
- SS Desabla
- MV Donovania
- SS Glentworth
- MV Harpa
- SS Holyhead Ferry I
- SS Nairnshire
- SS Port Hardy
- SS Port Hunter
- SS Port Nicholson
- SS Ranchi
- SS Ranpura
- SS Suntrap
- SS Kalender (Bosphorus No.67)
- SS Guzelhisar (Bosphorus No.68)

== See also ==
- List of shipbuilders and shipyards
- Category:Hawthorn Leslie and Company locomotives
