= HMS St. Kitts =

Battle-class destroyer

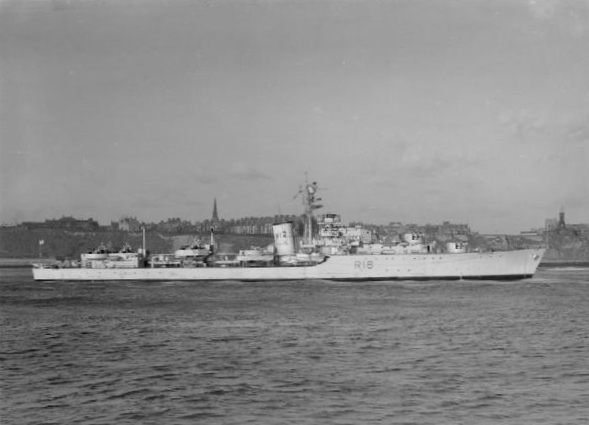
- HMS St. Kitts

History

United Kingdom
- Name: HMS St. Kitts
- Builder: Swan Hunter
- Laid down: 8 September 1943
- Launched: 4 October 1944
- Commissioned: 21 January 1946
- Decommissioned: 1957
- Identification: Pennant number D18
- Fate: Sold for scrap 19 February 1962

General characteristics
- Class & type: Battle-class destroyer
- Displacement: 2,315 tons
- Length: 379 ft (116 m)
- Beam: 40.25 ft (12.27 m)
- Draught: 12.75 ft (3.89 m) (mean); 17.5 ft (5.3 m) (max)
- Propulsion: Parsons geared turbines; 2 shafts. 50,000 shp (37,000 kW)
- Speed: 34 knots (63 km/h; 39 mph)
- Complement: 250 (peace), 337 (war)
- Armament: 2 × dual 4.5-inch (114 mm) gun; 1 × single 4 in gun; 14 × Bofors 40 mm gun; 8 × 21 inch (533 mm) torpedo tubes

HMS St. Kitts was a Battle-class destroyer of the Royal Navy (RN). She was named in honour of the Battle of St. Kitts which took place in 1782. So far she has been the only ship of the Royal Navy to bear the name. St. Kitts was built by Swan Hunter & Wigham Richardson Limited on the Tyne. She was launched on 4 October 1944 and commissioned on 21 January 1946.

== Service ==
St. Kitts joined the 5th Destroyer Flotilla of the Home Fleet upon commission. In 1948, St. Kitts deployed to the Arctic to join the aircraft carrier Vengeance, along with a variety of other ships, including other Battle-class destroyers during experiments in that region. In 1953, St. Kitts took part in the large Fleet Review at Spithead to celebration the Coronation of Queen Elizabeth II. St. Kitts was positioned in the middle of her sister ships Camperdown and Barfleur. St. Kitts was subsequently placed in Reserve.

In 1954, St. Kitts joined the 3rd Destroyer Flotilla, also part of the Home Fleet. In 1955, St. Kitts, still with the 3rd Flotilla, deployed to the Mediterranean, and took part in the Suez Crisis, which had occurred after the nationalisation of the Suez Canal by the Egyptian leader Nasser. During Operation Musketeer, the invasion of Egypt, St. Kitts performed a variety of duties, including escorting the carrier Eagle, as well as participating in the naval bombardment of Port Said. That same year, St. Kitts, along with the rest of the Flotilla, left the Mediterranean to join the Home Fleet.

== Decommissioning and disposal ==
In 1957, St. Kitts was decommissioned, being scrapped in 1962 at Sunderland.

== Publications ==
- Colledge, J. J.; Warlow, Ben (2006) [1969]. Ships of the Royal Navy: The Complete Record of All Fighting Ships of the Royal Navy from the 15th Century to the Present (3rd Rev ed.). London: Chatham Publishing. ISBN 978-1-86176-281-8. OCLC 67375475.
- Hodges, Peter (1971). Battle Class Destroyers. London: Almark Publishing. ISBN 0-85524-012-1.
