= HMS Barfleur (D80) =

Battle-class destroyer

- HMS Barfleur

History

United Kingdom
- Name: HMS Barfleur
- Builder: Swan Hunter, Tyne and Wear, United Kingdom
- Laid down: 28 October 1942
- Launched: 1 November 1943
- Commissioned: 14 September 1944
- Identification: Pennant number D80
- Fate: Broken up 1966

General characteristics
- Class & type: Battle-class destroyer
- Displacement: 2,325 tons standard; 3,430 tons full load
- Length: 379 ft (116 m)
- Beam: 40 ft (12 m)
- Draught: 15.3 ft (4.7 m)
- Propulsion: 2 steam turbines, 2 shafts, 2 boilers, 50,000 shp (37 MW)
- Speed: 35.75 knots (66.21 km/h; 41.14 mph)
- Range: 4,400 nmi (8,100 km; 5,100 mi) at 12 knots (22 km/h; 14 mph)
- Complement: 268
- Armament: 2 × dual 4.5-inch (114 mm) gun; 1 × single 4-inch (102 mm) gun; 14 × Bofors 40 mm gun; 8 × 21 inch (533 mm) torpedo tubes; 1 × Squid mortar

Service record
- Part of: British Pacific Fleet 1944-45; 19th Destroyer Flotilla; 3rd Destroyer Flotilla
- Operations: Second World War; Operation Musketeer (1956)

HMS Barfleur was a Battle-class destroyer of the Royal Navy (RN). She was named after the Battle of Barfleur, which involved an Anglo-Dutch Fleet against the French in 1692.

Barfleur was built by Swan Hunter & Wigham Richardson Limited on the Tyne. She was launched on 1 November 1943 and commissioned on 14 September 1944.

== Design and construction ==
The Battle-class was developed as a result of operational experience in the early years of the Second World War, which had shown that the Royal Navy's existing destroyers had inadequate anti-aircraft protection, and in particular, lacked a modern dual-purpose main gun armament, capable of dealing with both surface targets and air attack, with guns lacking the high elevation mountings necessary to deal with dive bombers. The resulting design was armed with two twin 4.5 inch high-angle gun-turrets of a new design mounted forward and a heavy close-in anti-aircraft armament, with 16 Battle-class destroyers ordered under the 1942 construction programme. Barfleur was ordered from Swan Hunter & Wigham Richardson Limited on 27 April 1942, and was one of three 1942 Battles ordered from Swan Hunter.

Barfleur was 379 ft 0 in (115.52 m) long overall, 364 ft 0 in (110.95 m) at the waterline and 355 ft 0 in (108.20 m) between perpendiculars, with a beam of 40 ft 3 in (12.27 m) and a draught of 12 ft 9 in (3.89 m) normal and 15 ft 3 in (4.65 m) at full load. Displacement was 2,315 long tons (2,352 t) standard and 3,290 long tons (3,340 t) full load. Two oil-fired Admiralty 3-drum boilers supplied steam at 400 psi (2,800 kPa) and 700 °F (371 °C) to two sets of Parsons single-reduction geared steam turbines which drove two propeller shafts. The machinery was rated at 50,000 shp (37,000 kW), giving a speed of 34 kn (39 mph; 63 km/h) (31 kn (36 mph; 57 km/h) at full load). 766 long tons (778 t) of fuel oil was carried, giving an endurance of 4,400 nmi (5,100 mi; 8,100 km) at 20 kn (23 mph; 37 km/h).

Two twin 4.5 inch (113 mm) Mark IV gun mounts, capable of elevating to 85 degrees, were mounted forward, while a single 4-inch gun was fitted behind the funnel for firing star shell. Close-in anti aircraft consisted of eight Bofors 40 mm guns in four twin stabilised Hazemayer mounts, with two power-operated 2-pounder guns on the bridge wings. Two quadruple 21 inch (533 mm) torpedo-tubes were fitted, while four depth charge launchers and two racks were fitted, with 60 depth charges carried. The ship had a crew of 247 officers and other ranks.

Barfleur, named after the 1692 Battle of La Hogue, and the fifth ship of that name to serve with the Royal Navy, was laid down at Swan Hunter's Wallsend shipyard on 28 October 1942, and was launched on 1 November 1943. Completion was delayed by the late availability of equipment, and while she was commissioned on 4 September 1944, the ship's director control tower was not fitted, and she was not accepted into service until November that year.

== Service ==
Following sea trials and workup of the ship, Barfleur underwent repair at Portsmouth in April 1945 before setting out for the Far East to join the 19th Destroyer Flotilla of the British Pacific Fleet. Barfleur was the only ship of the class to see action during the Second World War. She arrived in the Pacific in July, escorting the aircraft carrier Indefatigable from the British Pacific Fleet's base at Manus Island to join Task Force 37 off Japan on 20 July. On 12 August 1945, Barfleur was selected as part of a token British force to remain off Japan while the majority of the British Pacific Fleet withdrew to prepare for Operation Olympic, the planned allied invasion of Kyushu. As such, she was present in Tokyo Bay when the Japanese signed the official surrender on the deck of the US battleship USS Missouri on 2 September 1945. Barfleur was then sent to Hokkaido to pick up ex-Prisoners of War and internees and ferry them to Tokyo Bay.

After the end of the war, Barfleur remained in the Far East with the 19th Flotilla, which was reinforced by five more Battle-class destroyers. Barfleur visited Sydney in October 1945, where she was repaired, and was refitted at Auckland from December 1945 to January 1946. Barfleur returned to the United Kingdom with the rest of her flotilla in 1947, being placed into reserve at Portsmouth on 15 January that year.

On 11 March 1953, Barfleur was recommissioned for service with the 3rd Destroyer Squadron of the Mediterranean Fleet. On 1 June 1953, it was reported that the power system of one of the ship's gun mountings had been damaged in a possible case of sabotage. On 15 June 1953, Barfleur took part in the Fleet Review at Spithead in celebration of the Coronation of Elizabeth II as a representative of the Mediterranean Fleet. Barfleur was positioned in the middle of the destroyers St. Kitts and Crossbow.

On 22 June 1953, Barfleur was ordered out of Malta to rescue survivors from an RAF Handley Page Hastings aircraft which had crashed in the Gulf of Sidra while on a flight between Castel Benito, Tripoli, Libya and RAF Habbaniya, Iraq. After picking up the sixteen passengers and crew, who were uninjured, the destroyer brought them back to Malta. In December 1954, Barfleur returned to British waters so that her crew could have Christmas leave at home.

The destroyer was involved in the Suez War in 1956, taking part in the Allied landings in early November. Barfleur returned home later in the year for the last time to join the Home Fleet.

In 1958, Barfleur was put in Reserve before being placed on the disposal list and broken up at Dalmuir in 1966.

== Bibliography ==
- Alston, J.R. Lieut R.N. (no date) (no publisher).H.M.S.BARFLUER Pacific Commission 1944-1946
- Colledge, J. J.; Warlow, Ben (2006) [1969]. Ships of the Royal Navy: The Complete Record of All Fighting Ships of the Royal Navy from the 15th Century to the Present (3rd Rev ed.). London: Chatham Publishing. ISBN 978-1-86176-281-8. OCLC 67375475.
- English, John (2008). Obdurate to Daring: British Fleet Destroyers 1941–45. Windsor: World Ship Society. ISBN 978-0-9560769-0-8.
- Friedman, Norman (2008). British Destroyers and Frigates: The Second World War and After. Barnsley, UK: Seaforth Publishing. ISBN 978-1-84832-015-4.
- Hobbs, David (2017). The British Pacific Fleet: The Royal Navy's Most Powerful Strike Force. Barnsley, UK: Seaforth Publishing. ISBN 978-1-52670283-8.
- Hodges, Peter (1971). Battle Class Destroyers. London: Almark Publishing. ISBN 0-85524-012-1.
- Lenton, H. T. (1970). Navies of the Second World War: British Fleet and Escort Destroyers: Volume Two. London: Macdonald & Co. (Publishers) Ltd. ISBN 0-356-03122-5.
- Manning, T. D.; Walker, C. F. (1959). British Warship Names. London: Putnam.
- Marriott, Leo (1989). Royal Navy Destroyers Since 1945. Shepperton, UK: Ian Allan. ISBN 0-7110-1817-0.
- Winton, John (1970). The Forgotten Fleet: The British Navy in the Pacific 1944–1945. New York: Coward-McCann, Inc.
