= HMS Armada (D14) =

Battle-class destroyer

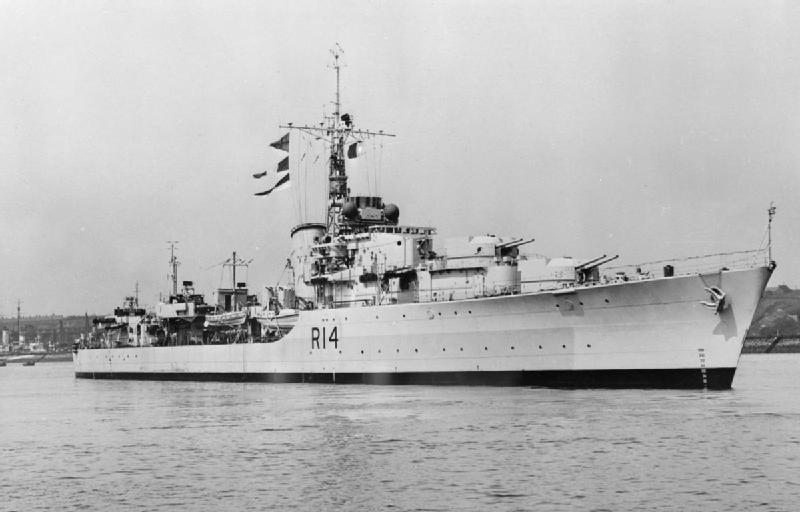
- HMS Armada

History

United Kingdom
- Name: HMS Armada
- Builder: Hawthorn Leslie and Company
- Laid down: 29 December 1942
- Launched: 9 December 1943
- Commissioned: 2 July 1945
- Decommissioned: 1960
- Identification: Pennant number D14
- Fate: Sold for breaking up, 1965

General characteristics
- Class & type: Battle-class destroyer
- Displacement: 2,325 tons
- Length: 379 ft (116 m)
- Beam: 40.25 ft (12.27 m)
- Armament: 4 × QF 4.5 in guns; 1 × 4 in gun; 8 × torpedo tubes

HMS Armada was a Battle-class destroyer of the Royal Navy (RN). She was named in honour of the English victory over the Spanish Armada in 1588. Armada was built by Hawthorn Leslie and Company on the Tyne. She was launched on 9 December 1943 and commissioned on 2 July 1945.

== Royal Navy service ==
In 1945, Armada joined the British Pacific Fleet but did not see action during the Second World War. The following year, as part of the 19th Destroyer Flotilla, Armada deployed to the Far East, performing a variety of duties while based there, and the following year, Armada, with the rest of the 19th Flotilla, returned home to the UK, visiting a variety of ports on the way, mainly on 'fly-the-flag' visits. Upon reaching the UK, Armada was placed in Reserve. In 1949, Armada joined the 3rd Destroyer Flotilla, deploying to the Mediterranean as part of that flotilla.

In 1950, Armada, while still based in the Mediterranean, was involved in a collision. Armada remained in the sunny climes of the Mediterranean until returning home to the UK with the rest of the 3rd Destroyer Flotilla. In 1956, Armada was in the area during the Suez Crisis in 1956, which took place in response to the Egyptian President Nasser's nationalisation of the Suez Canal. She subsequently returned to home waters when she, now Captain (D) of the 3rd Destroyer Flotilla, meaning that she was the leader of the flotilla, joined the Home Fleet. In June, 1958 Armada provided escort for the Royal Yacht whilst the Queen visited North East England. Following this she steamed anti clockwise around Scotland and proceeded into the Mediterranean and then onto to the conflict in Cyprus patrolling up and down the west coast to prevent arms smuggling.

== Decommissioning and fate ==
In 1960, Armada was decommissioned, and in 1965, she was sold to Thos. W. Ward for scrapping at Inverkeithing.

== Publications ==
- Colledge, J. J.; Warlow, Ben (2006) [1969]. Ships of the Royal Navy: The Complete Record of All Fighting Ships of the Royal Navy from the 15th Century to the Present (3rd Rev ed.). London: Chatham Publishing. ISBN 978-1-86176-281-8. OCLC 67375475.
- Hodges, Peter (1971). Battle Class Destroyers. London: Almark Publishing. ISBN 0-85524-012-1.
