= 3rd Destroyer Flotilla =

- Active: June 1909–November 1939, December 1945- July 1951
- Country: United Kingdom
- Branch: Royal Navy
- Size: Flotilla

Commanders
- First: Captain Godfrey M. Paine
- Last: Captain Peter Dawnay

The British 3rd Destroyer Flotilla, also styled as Third Destroyer Flotilla, was a naval formation of the Royal Navy from 1909 to 1939 and again from 1945 to 1951.

== History ==
In 1907 the Channel Fleet had a large Channel Flotilla of destroyers in February 1909 when it was divided to form the 1st and 3rd Destroyer Flotillas. From March 1909 to May 1912 the formation was part of the Nore Division, 3rd Division Home Fleet. In May 1912, the Home Fleet was split into the First Fleet, with ships in full commission, and the Second and Third Fleets, composed of ships partly crewed and laid up in reserve respectively. The 3rd Destroyer Flotilla remained part of the First Fleet until July 1914.

On the outbreak of the First World War, the First Fleet became the Grand Fleet, and the 3rd Destroyer Flotilla joined the newly formed Harwich Force. In the summer of 1915 it was renumbered the 9th Destroyer Flotilla. It was reformed again from March 1918 as part of the Grand Fleet till November 1918.

After the War the Flotilla joined the Atlantic Fleet, forming part of that organisation from December 1918 until August 1923. It was then allocated to the Mediterranean Fleet until 1926 when it was temporarily assigned to the China Station until 1927. It returned to the Mediterranean until 1938. By the beginning of World War Two in September 1939 it was still in the Mediterranean Fleet. It was re-allocated to the Home Fleet in October 1939 to November 1944 under the command of the Rear-Admiral, Destroyer Flotillas Home Fleet. The flotilla was sent back to join the Mediterranean Fleet in November 1944.

Throughout this period the term Flotilla had applied to a tactical unit. In 1951, instead, three specific Flag Officers, Flotillas, were created responsible for escorts up to cruisers for the Eastern, Home and Mediterranean fleets. The previous destroyer flotillas were redesignated squadrons, and thus the 3rd Destroyer Flotilla became the 3rd Destroyer Squadron in July 1951.

== Operational deployments ==
Assigned to	Dates	Notes
Channel Fleet	March 1907 to February 1909	as Home Fleet Destroyer Flotilla
Home Fleet, 3rd Division, Nore Division	March 1909 to May 1912	
Home Fleets, First Fleet	May 1912 to July 1914	disbanded
Grand Fleet	March 1918 to November 1918	reformed
Atlantic Fleet	December 1918 to August 1923	
Mediterranean Fleet	August 1923 to 1926	temporarily detached to China Station
China Station	1926 to 1927	returns to Med Fleet
Mediterranean Fleet	1928 to October 1939	
Home Fleet	October 1939 to November 1944	Under R.Adm Destroyer Flotillas, Home Fleet
Mediterranean Fleet	November 1944 to July 1951	Captain (D) appointed December 1945

== Flotilla commander ==
The commander of the 3rd Destroyer Flotilla held the title of Captain (Destroyers), or 'Captain (D)'. Those officers included (incomplete list):

	Rank	Name	Term	Notes
Captain (D) afloat 3rd Destroyer Flotilla
1	Captain	Godfrey M. Paine	2 June, 1909 1 May, 1912	
2	Captain	Robert K. Arbuthnot	1 May, 1912 – 31 July, 1912	(later R. Adm)
3	Captain	Ernest S. Carey	1 July, 1912 – 3 April, 1913	
4	Captain	Cecil H. Fox	3 April, 1913 – 26 October, 1914	
5	Captain	Francis G. St. John	26 October, 1914 - 15 August, 1917	
6	Captain	Harold E. Sulivan	15 August, 1917 – 1 March, 1919	
7	Captain	Frank F. Rose	7 July, 1921– 6 July, 1923	
8	Captain	Rafe G. Rowley-Conwy	1 March, 1919 – 7 July, 1919	(later R. Adm)
9	Captain	Francis Alexander Waddilove Buller	7 July, 1919 – 7 July, 1921	(later R. Adm)
10	Captain	Frank F. Rose	7 July, 1921– 6 July, 1923	
11	Captain	Humphrey T. Walwyn	July, 1923 – October, 1923	(later V.Adm)
12	Captain	John C. Hodgson	6 July, 1923 – 20 October, 1923	
13	Captain	Dashwood F. Moir	20 October, 1923 – January, 1925	
14	Captain	Charles G. Ramsey	15 January, 1925 – January, 1927	(later Adm.)
15	Captain	Cyril G. Sedgwick	16 October, 1928 – 21 June, 1930	
16	Captain	Roderick B. T. Miles	21 June, 1930 - 22 July, 1935	
17	Captain	Geoffrey J. A. Miles	22 July, 1935 – 25 May, 1937	(later Adm.)
18	Captain	Arthur G. Talbot	25 May, 1937 – 7 November, 1939	
Flotilla is re-established November 1944 no Captain (D) till December 1945.
19	Captain	William H. Selby	December 1945 – 1947	
20	Captain	Laurence G. Durlacher	January 1948-July 1950	
21	Captain	Peter Dawnay	July 1950 – July 1951	

== Composition 1945 to 1951 ==
Included: (United Kingdom) , Mediterranean Fleet 1945
3rd Destroyer Flotilla

- HMS Troubridge (Leader)
- HMS Venus
- HMS Verulam
- HMS Virago
- HMS Volage
- HMS Brissenden

(United Kingdom) , Mediterranean Fleet 1946
3rd Destroyer Flotilla

- HMS Troubridge (Leader)
- HMS Venus
- HMS Verulam
- HMS Virago
- HMS Volage
- HMS Brissenden

(United Kingdom) , Mediterranean Fleet 1947
3rd Destroyer Flotilla

- HMS Troubridge (Leader)
- HMS Venus
- HMS Verulam
- HMS Virago
- HMS Volage
- HMS Brissenden
- HMS Haydon - (October 1947)
- HMS Stevenstone -(October 1947)
- HMS Talybont - (October 1947)

(United Kingdom) , Mediterranean Fleet 1948
3rd Destroyer Flotilla

- HMS Troubridge (Leader)
- HMS Venus
- HMS Verulam
- HMS Virago
- HMS Volage

(United Kingdom) , Mediterranean Fleet 1949
3rd Destroyer Flotilla

- HMS Troubridge (Leader)
- HMS Venus
- HMS Verulam
- HMS Virago
- HMS Volage - (July 1949)
- HMS Saintes (Leader) (July 1949)
- HMS Armada - (July 1949)
- HMS Gravelines - (July 1949)
- HMS Vigo - (July 1949)

(United Kingdom) , Mediterranean Fleet 1950
3rd Destroyer Flotilla

- HMS Saintes (Leader)
- HMS Armada
- HMS Gravelines
- HMS Vigo

(United Kingdom) , Mediterranean Fleet 1951
3rd Destroyer Flotilla

- HMS Saintes (Leader)
- HMS Armada
- HMS Gravelines
- HMS Vigo

== Sources ==
- Manning, T. D. (1961). The British Destroyer. London: Putnam.
- Harley, Simon; Lovell, Tony. (2018) "Third Destroyer Flotilla (Royal Navy) - The Dreadnought Project". www.dreadnoughtproject.org. Harley and Lovell, 29 May 2018. Retrieved 9 July 2018.
- Watson, Dr Graham. (2015) Royal Navy Organisation and Ship Deployments 1900-1914". www.naval-history.net. G. Smith.
- Watson, Dr Graham. (2015) "Royal Navy Organisation and Ship Deployment, Inter-War Years 1914-1918". www.naval-history.net. Gordon Smith.
- Watson, Dr Graham. (2015) "Royal Navy Organisation in World War 2, 1939-1945". www.naval-history.net. Gordon Smith.
