= 4th Destroyer Squadron =

- Active: March 1951 – April 1959
- Country: United Kingdom
- Branch: Royal Navy
- Size: Squadron

Commanders
- First: Captain Ralph G. Swallow
- Last: Captain Erroll N. Sinclair

The 4th Destroyer Squadron was a naval unit of the Royal Navy from 1951 to 1959.

== Overview ==
After World War II, the British Navy reverted to its previous layout and command structure in 1950 the 4th Destroyer Flotilla of the Home Fleet was disbanded and succeeded by the 4th Destroyer Squadron. The Admiralty controlled global deployment of the navy until 1964 when that department was abolished and replaced by the new Navy Department, Ministry of Defence. These geographic commands usually comprised fleets, squadrons, flotillas, and single ships. In 1954, major re-structuring of the composition of the navy was undertaken, leading to downsizing and warships being rotated between the various fleets and stations. In 1954 and 1971, many of these commands were abolished or amalgamated into larger geographic commands. In November 1971, nearly all British naval forces were brought under the command of a single fleet whose headquarters was at Northwood, Middlesex then under the control of Commander-in-Chief Fleet.

== Organizational changes ==
Note: Command structure organizational changes took place within Royal Navy post war period the term Flotilla was previously applied to a tactical unit until 1951 which led to the creation of three specific Flag Officers, Flotillas responsible for the Eastern, Home and Mediterranean fleets the existing destroyer flotillas were re-organized now as administrative squadrons.

== Deployments ==
Included:

| from | to | deployed to | additional notes |
|---|---|---|---|
| 1951 | 1952 | Mediterranean Fleet | |
| 1953 | 1955 | Home Fleet | |
| 1956 | 1957 | Mediterranean Fleet | |
| 1958 | 1959 | Home Fleet | |

== Composition ==
Included:

(United Kingdom) , Mediterranean Fleet 1951
4th Destroyer Squadron

- HMS Agincourt (Leader)
- HMS Corunna
- HMS Gabbard replaced by HMS Aisne (1951)
- HMS St. James replaced by HMS Jutland (1951)

(United Kingdom) , Mediterranean Fleet 1952
4th Destroyer Squadron

- HMS Agincourt (Leader)
- HMS Aisne
- HMS Corunna
- HMS Jutland

(United Kingdom) , Home Fleet 1953
4th Destroyer Squadron

- HMS Agincourt (Leader)
- HMS Aisne
- HMS Corunna
- HMS Jutland

(United Kingdom) , Home Fleet 1954
4th Destroyer Squadron

- HMS Agincourt (Leader)
- HMS Aisne
- HMS Barrosa
- HMS Corunna

(United Kingdom) , Home Fleet 1955
4th Destroyer Squadron

- HMS Agincourt (Leader)
- HMS Aisne
- HMS Barrosa
- HMS Corunna

(United Kingdom) , Mediterranean 1956
4th Destroyer Squadron

- HMS Agincourt (Leader)
- HMS Aisne
- HMS Barrosa
- HMS Corunna

(United Kingdom) , Mediterranean 1957
4th Destroyer Squadron

- HMS Agincourt (Leader)
- HMS Alamein
- HMS Barrosa
- HMS Corunna

(United Kingdom) , Home Fleet 1958
4th Destroyer Squadron

- HMS Agincourt (Leader)
- HMS Alamein
- HMS Barrosa
- HMS Corunna

(United Kingdom) , Home Fleet 1959
4th Destroyer Squadron

- HMS Agincourt (Leader)
- HMS Alamein
- HMS Barrosa
- HMS Corunna

== Squadron commander ==
Included:

| Commander | Lead Ship | Dates |
|---|---|---|
| Captain Martin J. Evans | HMS Agincourt | March 1951-August 1952 |
| Captain John Lee-Barber | HMS Agincourt | August 1952-April 1954 |
| Captain Ronald G. Mills | HMS Agincourt | April–December 1954 |
| Captain Nicholas A. Copeman | HMS Agincourt | December 1954-March 1956 |
| Captain Derick H. F. Hetherington | HMS Agincourt | March 1956-November 1957 |
| Captain Erroll N. Sinclair | HMS Agincourt | November 1957-April 1959 |

== See also ==
- List of squadrons and flotillas of the Royal Navy

== Sources ==
- Smith. Gordon and Watson, Graham. (2015) The Royal Navy, post 1945. Royal Navy Organisation and Ship Deployments 1947-2013. http://www.naval-history.net.
