= List of ship launches in 1946 =

This list of ship launches in 1946 includes a list of ships launched in 1946.

Date	Ship	Class / type	Builder	Location	Country	Notes
4 January	Leonard F. Mason	Gearing-class destroyer	Fore River Shipyard	Quincy, Massachusetts	United States	
5 January	Danube VII	Tug	Cochrane & Sons Ltd	Selby	United Kingdom	For Tilbury Contracting & Dredging Co. Ltd.
5 January	Spaburn	Coastal water carrier			United Kingdom	For Royal Fleet Auxiliary
5 January	Robert L. Wilson	Gearing-class destroyer	Bath Iron Works	Bath, Maine	United States	
8 January	Eversole	Gearing-class destroyer	Todd Pacific Shipyards	Seattle	United States	
8 January	Kallada	Cargo ship	Charles Connell & Co Ltd	Glasgow	United Kingdom	For J. Nourse Ltd.
15 January	Empire Athelstan	Heavy lift cargo ship	Vickers-Armstrongs Ltd	Barrow in Furness	United Kingdom	For Ministry of Transport
16 January	Empire Southwold	Cargo ship	Bartram & Sons Ltd	Sunderland	United Kingdom	For Ministry of Transport.
16 January	Galeomma	Tanker	J. L. Thompson & Sons Ltd.	Sunderland	United Kingdom	For N.V. Curaçaosche Scheepsvaarts Maatschappij.
17 January	Chessington	Collier	Burntisland Shipbuilding Company	Burntisland	United Kingdom	For Wandsworth & District Gas Company.
17 January	Empire Evesham	tanker	Furness Shipbuilding Co Ltd	Haverton Hill-on-Tees	United Kingdom	For Ministry of Transport
17 January	Empire Sloane	Coaster	Shipbuilding Corporation.	Newcastle upon Tyne	United Kingdom	For Ministry of Transport.
17 January	Empire Tedson	TED-type coastal tanker	Grangemouth Dockyard Co. Ltd.	Grangemouth	United Kingdom	Completed as Arduity for F. T. Everard & Sons Ltd.
17 January	Forrest Royal	Gearing-class destroyer	Bethlehem Steel	Staten Island, New York	United States	
17 January	Okhla	Cargo ship	John Readhead & Sons Ltd.	South Shields	United Kingdom	For BRitish India Steam Navigation Co. Ltd.
17 January	Santander	Cargo ship	Harland & Wolff	Belfast	United Kingdom	For Pacific Steam Navigation Company.
17 January	TID 178	TID-class tug	William Pickersgill & Sons Ltd.	Sunderland	United Kingdom	For Ministry of War Transport.
17 January	TID 179	TID-class tug	William Pickersgill & Sons Ltd.	Sunderland	United Kingdom	For Ministry of War Transport.
18 January	City of Poona	Cargo ship	Swan, Hunter & Wigham Richardson Ltd.	Newcastle upon Tyne	United Kingdom	For Ellerman Lines Ltd.
18 January	Empire Gower	Collier	William Gray & Co. Ltd.	West Hartlepool	United Kingdom	For Ministry of Transport.
18 January	Empire Tedlora	TED-type coastal tanker	Short Bros. Ltd.	Sunderland	United Kingdom	For Ministry of Transport.
21 January	Empire Raymond	Near-Warrior type tug	A. Hall & Co. Ltd.	Aberdeen	United Kingdom	For Ministry of War Transport.
21 January	TID 173	TID-class tug	Henry Scarr Ltd.	Hessle	United Kingdom	Ministry of War Transport.
22 January	Anchorite	Amphion-class submarine	Vickers-Armstrongs	Barrow in Furness	United Kingdom	
2 February	Empire Tedburgh	TED-type coastal tanker	Short Bros. Ltd.	Sunderland	United Kingdom	Completed as Dovedale H. for J. Harker (Coasters) Ltd.
2 February	Witek	Gearing-class destroyer	Bath Iron Works	Bath, Maine	United States	
4 February	Dunkinty	Trawler	John Lewis & Sons Ltd.	Aberdeen	United Kingdom	For Looker Fishing Co. Ltd.
4 February	Empire Hedda	Modified Stella-type tug	Cochrane & Sons Ltd.	Selby	United Kingdom	For Ministry of War Transport. Completed as Atlas for Bergnings och Dykari A/B.
4 February	Empire Seafoam	Shelt-type coaster	Goole Shipbuilding & Repairing Co Ltd	Goole	United Kingdom	For Ministry of War Transport.
4 February	Port Wellington	Refrigerated cargo ship	J. & G. Thompson Ltd.	Clydebank	United Kingdom	For Federal Steam Navigation Co. Ltd.
5 February	Empire Tedmuir	TED-type Coastal tanker	A & J Inglis Ltd.	Glasgow	United Kingdom	For Ministry of Transport.
5 February	Ino	Coaster	Goole Shipbuilding & Repairing Co. Ltd.	Goole	United Kingdom	For Bristol Steam Navigation Co. Ltd.
5 February	Lestris	Cargo ship	Hall, Russell & Co. Ltd.	Aberdeen	United Kingdom	For British & Continental Steamship Co. Ltd.
5 February	Mona's Queen	Ferry	Cammell Laird & Co. Ltd.	Birkenhead	United Kingdom	For Isle of Man Steam Packet Co. Ltd.
5 February	Unnamed	Cargo ship	William Pickersgill & Co. Ltd.	Southwick	United Kingdom	Laid down as an Empire ship, completed in June as Hubert for Hain Steamship Co. Ltd.
7 February	Gansella	Tanker	J. L. Thompson & Sons Ltd.	Sunderland	United Kingdom	For N.V. Curaçaosche Scheepsvaart Maatschappij.
8 February	Empire Juna	Modified Stella-type tug	Cochrane & Sons Ltd.	Selby	United Kingdom	For Ministry of War Transport.
15 February	Arakaka	Cargo ship	Smith's Dock Co. Ltd.	Middlesbrough	United Kingdom	For Booker Bros., McConnell & Co. Ltd.
15 February	Bluebird	Penguin-class submarine rescue ship	Charleston Shipbuilding & Drydock Co	North Charleston, South Carolina	United States	
15 February	Latia	Tanker	R. & W. Hawthorn, Leslie and Co. Ltd.	Newcastle on Tyne	United Kingdom	For Anglo-Saxon Petroleum Co. Ltd.
16 February	Moray Firth	Coaster	John Lewis & Sons Ltd.	Aberdeen	United Kingdom	For Firth Shipping Co. Ltd.
18 February	Sparrow	Modified Black Swan-class sloop			United Kingdom	
18 February	Alaric	Amphion-class submarine	Cammell Laird	Birkenhead	United Kingdom	
18 February	Urlana	Cargo ship	William Gray & Co. Ltd.	West Hartlepool	United Kingdom	For British India Steam Navigation Co. Ltd.
19 February	Empire Flodden	Wave-class oiler	Furness Shipbuilding Co Ltd	Haverton Hill-on-Tees	United Kingdom	For Ministry of Transport. Completed as RFA Wave Baron for Royal Fleet Auxiliary.
19 February	Halfbeak	Balao-class submarine	Cramp Shipbuilding Company	Philadelphia	United States	
19 February	Pawcatuck	Ashtabula-class replenishment oiler	Sun Shipbuilding and Drydock Company	Chester, Pennsylvania	United States	
20 February	Jutland	Modified Battle-class destroyer			United Kingdom	
21 February	Empire Marshland	Dredger	William Simons & Co. Ltd.	Renfrew	United Kingdom	For Ministry of Transport.
21 February	Empire Sorcerer'	Dredger	Ferguson Brothers Ltd.	Port Glasgow	United Kingdom	For the Admiralty.
22 February	Sinkiang	Cargo ship	Scotts Shipbuilding and Engineering Co. Ltd.	Greenock	United Kingdom	For China Navigation Co. Ltd.
28 February	Spapool	Coastal water carrier			United Kingdom	For Royal Fleet Auxiliary
28 February	Artemis	Amphion-class submarine	Scotts	Greenock	United Kingdom	
4 March	Empire Lowlander	Collier	John Crown & Sons Ltd.	Sunderland	United Kingdom	For Ministry of War Transport. Completed as Corflow for Wm. Cory & Son Ltd.
4 March	Empire Mercia	Refrigerated cargo ship	Harland & Wolff	Belfast	United Kingdom	For Ministry of War Transport. Completed as Empire Star for Blue Star Line.
5 March	Ariosto	Cargo ship	William Gray & Co. Ltd.	West Hartlepool	United Kingdom	For Ellerman's Wilson Line Ltd.
5 March	Bryce Canyon	Shenandoah-class destroyer tender	Charleston Navy Yard	North Charleston, South Carolina	United States	
5 March	Empire Lola	Modified Stella-type tug	George Brown & Co. (Marine) Ltd.	Greenock	United Kingdom	For Ministry of War Transport.
5 March	Fresno	Atlanta-class cruiser	Federal Shipbuilding	Kearny, New Jersey	United States	
5 March	Manchester	Cleveland-class cruiser	Fore River Shipyard	Quincy, Massachusetts	United States	
5 March	Redstart	Cargo ship	Henry Robb Ltd.	Leith	United Kingdom	For General Steam Navigation Co. Ltd.
5 March	Rustenburg Castle	Refrigerated cargo ship	Harland & Wolff	Belfast	United Kingdom	For Union-Castle Line.
5 March	Taff	Dredger	Fleming & Furguson Ltd.	Paisley	United Kingdom	For Great Western Railway.
	Empire Lucy	Near-Warrior type tug	J. S. Watson Ltd.	Gainsborough	United Kingdom	For the Admiralty.
6 March	Lyria	Tanker	Harland & Wolff	Belfast	United Kingdom	For Anglo-Saxon Petroleum Company.
7 March	Tahsinia	Cargo ship	Lithgows Ltd.	Port Glasgow	United Kingdom	For Anchor Line Ltd.
8 March	Shelton	Gearing-class destroyer	Todd Pacific Shipyards	Seattle	United States	
8 March	VIC 57	VIC lighter	J. Pollock & Sons Ltd.	Faversham	United Kingdom	For Ministry of War Transport.
14 March	VIC 34	VIC lighter	Isaac Pimblott & Sons Ltd.	Northwich	United Kingdom	For the Admiralty.
15 March	Charles H. Roan	Gearing-class destroyer	Fore River Shipyard	Quincy, Massachusetts	United States	
18 March	Crichtoun	Icemaid type collier	Grangemouth Dockyard Co. Ltd.	Grangemouth	United Kingdom	For G. Gibson & Co. Ltd.
19 March	Eagle	Audacious-class aircraft carrier	Harland & Wolff	Belfast	United Kingdom	For Royal Navy.
19 March	Empire Forager	Dredger	William Simons & Co Ltd	Greenock	United Kingdom	For Ministry of War Transport.
21 March	Empire Warner	Scandinavian type cargo ship	Ailsa Shipbuilding & Co. Ltd.	Troon	United Kingdom	For Ministry of War Transport. Completed as Uskside for Uskside Steamship Co. Ltd.
21 March	Maidan	Cargo ship	William Hamilton & Co. Ltd.	Port Glasgow	United Kingdom	For T. & J. Brocklebank Ltd.
21 March	Neothauma	Tanker	Blythswood Shipbuilding Co. Ltd.	Glasgow	United Kingdom	For Anglo-Saxon Petroleum Co. Ltd.
28 March	VIC 65	VIC lighter	Isaac Pimblott & Sons Ltd.	Northwich	United Kingdom	For Ministry of War Transport.
30 March	Agerholm	Gearing-class destroyer	Bath Iron Works	Bath, Maine	United States	
30 March	Waccamaw	Cimarron-class oiler	Sun Shipbuilding and Drydock Company	Chester, Pennsylvania	United States	
March	Mountpark	Cargo ship	Charles Connell & Co Ltd	Glasgow	United Kingdom	For J. & J. Denholm Ltd.
March	Somerset	Refrigerated cargo liner	Alexander Stephen & Sons Ltd.	Linthouse	United Kingdom	For Federal Steam Navigation Co. Ltd.
March	VIC 105	Improved VIC lighter	Shipbuilding Corporation	Newcastle upon Tyne	United Kingdom	For the Admiralty.
March	VIC 106	Improved VIC lighter	Shipbuilding Corporation	Newcastle upon Tyne	United Kingdom	For the Admiralty.
2 April	Coral Sea	Midway-class aircraft carrier	Newport News Shipbuilding	Newport News, Virginia	United States	
2 April	Salaverry	Cargo ship	Harland & Wolff	Belfast	United Kingdom	For Pacific Steam Navigation Company.
3 April	Empire Dunbar	Wave-class oiler	Sir J. Laing & Sons Ltd.	Sunderland, Co Durham	United Kingdom	For Ministry of Transport. Completed as RFA Wave Laird for Royal Fleet Auxiliary.
3 April	Margay	Cargo ship	Bartram & Sons Ltd	Sunderland	United Kingdom	For Kaye, Son & Co. Ltd.
3 April	Umaria	Cargo ship	William Gray & Co. Ltd.	West Hartlepool	United Kingdom	For British India Steam Navigation Co. Ltd.
4 April	Empire Edgehill	Wave-class oiler	Harland & Wolff Ltd.	Govan	United Kingdom	For Ministry of Transport. Completed as RFA Wave Chief for Royal Fleet Auxiliary.
4 April	Empire Maydream	Coaster	A Hall & Co Ltd	Aberdeen	United Kingdom	For Ministry of Transport
4 April	Helicina	Tanker	Swan, Hunter & Wigham Richardson Ltd.	Wallsend	United Kingdom	For Anglo-Saxon Petroleum Co. Ltd. Requisitioned by the Admiralty with the intention of completion as RFA Oleander for the Royal Fleet Auxiliary. Hostilities ended before completion so returned to owners.
4 April	Sir Alexander Kennedy	C-type coaster	S. P. Austin & Sons Ltd.	Sunderland	United Kingdom	For London Power Co. Ltd.
6 April	Avondow	Trawler	John Lewis & Sons Ltd.	Aberdeen	United Kingdom	For North Star Fishing Co. Ltd.
14 April	Cato	Coaster	Goole Shipbuilding & Repairing Co. Ltd.	Goole	United Kingdom	For Bristol Steam Navigation Co. Ltd.
16 April	Cape Ortegal	Cargo ship	Lithgows Ltd.	Port Glasgow	United Kingdom	For Cape of Good Hope Motorships Co. Ltd.
16 April	Empire Gantock	Cargo ship	Shipbuilding Corporation Ltd.	Newcastle upon Tyne	United Kingdom	For Ministry of Transport Completed as Martita for "K" Steamships Ltd.
16 April	Geomitra	Tanker	Smith's Dock Co. Ltd.	North Shields	United Kingdom	For N.V. Curaçaosche Scheepsvaarts Maatschappij.
16 April	John Holt	Cargo ship	Cammell Laird & Co. Ltd.	Birkenhead	United Kingdom	For John Holt & Co (Liverpool) Ltd.
16 April	Linga	Tanker	Harland & Wolff	Belfast	United Kingdom	For Anglo-Saxon Petroleum Co. Ltd.
17 April	Auricula	Tanker	R. & W. Hawthorn, Leslie and Co. Ltd.	Newcastle on Tyne	United Kingdom	For Anglo-Saxon Petroleum Co. Ltd.
17 April	Empire Woodland	Dredger	William Simons & Co. Ltd.	Greenock	United Kingdom	For Ministry of Transport.
18 April	Balaena	Factory ship	Harland & Wolff	Belfast	United Kingdom	For United Whalers Ltd.
18 April	VIC 66	VIC lighter	Isaac Pimblott & Sons Ltd.	Northwich	United Kingdom	For Ministry of War Transport.
23 April	Ulua	Balao-class submarine	Cramp Shipbuilding Company	Philadelphia	United States	
27 April	BO-173	Kronshtadt-class submarine chaser	Zelenodolsk Gorky Plant	Zelenedolsk	Soviet Union	
27 April	BO-270	Kronshtadt-class submarine chaser	Zelenodolsk Gorky Plant	Zelenedolsk	Soviet Union	
28 April	BO-171	Kronshtadt-class submarine chaser	Zelenodolsk Gorky Plant	Zelenedolsk	Soviet Union	
28 April	BO-172	Kronshtadt-class submarine chaser	Zelenodolsk Gorky Plant	Zelenedolsk	Soviet Union	
30 April	British Princess	Tanker	Sir James Laing & Sons Ltd.	Sunderland	United Kingdom	For British Tanker Co. Ltd.
30 April	Burton Island	Wind-class icebreaker	Western Pipe and Steel Company	San Francisco	United States	
April	Eucadia	Cargo ship	Barclay, Curle & Co. Ltd.	Glasgow	United Kingdom	For Anchor Line.
April	Poictiers	Destroyer			United Kingdom	Scrapped shortly after launch.
April	Empire Tedrita	TED-type Coastal tanker	A & J Inglis Ltd.	Glasgow	United Kingdom	For Ministry of Transport.
1 May	Nirumand	Tug	Scott & Sons Ltd.	Bowling	United Kingdom	For Petroleum Steamship Co. Ltd.
May 2	Southern Harvester	Tanker	Furness Shipbuilding Co. Ltd.	Haverton Hill-on-Tees	United Kingdom	For South Georgia Co.
3 May	Clan Cumming	Cargo ship	Greenock Dockyard Co. Ltd.	Greenock	United Kingdom	For the Clan Line Steamers Ltd.
3 May	Corsair	Tench-class submarine	Electric Boat	Groton, Connecticut	United States	
5 May	Empire Leonard	Near-Warrior type tug	A. Hall & Co. Ltd.	Aberdeen	United Kingdom	Completed as Sun XVI W. H. J. Alexander Ltd.
15 May	Brixton	C-type coaster	S. P. Austin & Sons Ltd.	Sunderland	United Kingdom	For South Metropolitan Gas Company.
15 May	Rowanol	Coastal tanker			United Kingdom	For Royal Fleet Auxiliary
15 May	Shetland	Cargo ship	Caledon Shipbuilding & Engineering Co. Ltd.	Dundee	United Kingdom	For Currie Line Ltd.
16 May	Empire Hartland	Hopper ship	Ferguson Brothers Ltd.	Port Glasgow	United Kingdom	For Ministry of Transport.
20 May	Beaverlake	Cargo ship	Lithgows Ltd.	Port Glasgow	United Kingdom	For Canadian Pacific Steamships Ltd.
29 May	British Rose	Tanker	J. L. Thompson & Sons Ltd.	Sunderland	United Kingdom	For British Tanker Co Ltd.
29 May	Edisto	Wind-class icebreaker	Western Pipe and Steel Company	San Pedro, California	United States	
29 May	Port Pirie	Cargo ship	Swan, Hunter & Wigham Richardson Ltd.	Wallsend	United Kingdom	For Port Line Ltd.
29 May	Seaman	Gearing-class destroyer	Seattle-Tacoma Shipbuilding Corporation	Seattle	United States	
31 May	Baskerville	Cargo ship	John Readhead & Sons Ltd.	South Shields	United Kingdom	For Barberry's Steamship Co. Ltd.
31 May	Hornby Grange	Refrigerated cargo ship	R. & W. Hawthorn, Leslie and Co. Ltd.	Newcastle upon Tyne	United Kingdom	For Houlder Line Ltd.
31 May	Malmo	Cargo ship	William Gray & Co. Ltd.	West Hartlepool	United Kingdom	For Ellerman's Wilson Line Ltd.
May	Wellpark	Cargo ship	Charles Connell & Co Ltd	Glasgow	United Kingdom	For J. & J. Denholm Ltd.
May	A half-ship	New fore section	Shipbuilding Corporation Ltd.	Newcastle upon Tyne	United Kingdom	For the steamship Harpagus.
1 June	Trapp	Coastal tanker	Rowhedge Ironworks Ltd	Rowhedge	United Kingdom	For Anglo-Saxon Petroleum Co. Ltd.
5 June	Empire Tessa	Modified Stella-type tug	William Simons & Co. Ltd.	Renfrew	United Kingdom	For Ministry of War Transport.
5 June	Linswe	L-class tug	Harland & Wolff	Belfast	United Kingdom	For Ministry of Transport.
12 June	British Knight	Tanker	Harland & Wolff	Belfast	United Kingdom	For British Tanker Company.
12 June	Linwet	L-class tug	Harland & Wolff	Belfast	United Kingdom	For Ministry of Transport.
13 June	Norfolk	Refrigerated cargo ship	J. & G. Thompson Ltd.	Clydebank	United Kingdom	For Federal Steam Navigation Co. Ltd.
15 June	Norden	cargo ship		Nakskov	Denmark	
16 June	Sun XVII	Near-Warrior type tug	A Hall & Co Ltd	Aberdeen	United Kingdom	For Ministry of War Transport.
18 June	Aros	Refrigerated cargo ship	Blyth Dry Docks & Shipbuilding Co. Ltd	Blyth, Northumberland	United Kingdom	For Rederi A/B Helsingborg.
24 June	Keppler	Gearing-class destroyer	Bethlehem Steel	San Francisco	United States	
27 June	Empire Marson	Wave-class oiler	Furness Shipbuilding Co. Ltd.	Haverton Hill-on-Tees	United Kingdom	For Ministry of Shipping. Completed as RFA Wave Premier for Royal Fleet Auxiliary.
28 June	British Earl	Tanker	Swan, Hunter & Wigham Richardson Ltd.	Newcastle upon Tyne	United Kingdom	For British Tanker Co. Ltd.
28 June	Patella	Tanker	Harland & Wolff	Belfast	United Kingdom	For Anglo-Saxon Petroleum Co Ltd
30 June	Bristol Queen	Paddle steamer	Charles Hill & Sons Ltd.	Bristol	United Kingdom	For P. & A. Campbell Ltd.
30 June	Unnamed	Standard Fast type Cargo liner	Caledon Shipbuilding & Engineering Co. Ltd.	Dundee	United Kingdom	For Ministry of Transport. Completed as Modjokerto for Dutch Government.
June	Landaura	Cargo ship	Barclay, Curle & Co. Ltd.	Glasgow	United Kingdom	For British India Steam Navigation Company.
June	Rinaldo	Cargo ship	William Gray & Co. Ltd.	West Hartlepool	United Kingdom	For Ellerman's Wilson Line Ltd.
1 July	Neritopsis	Tanker	Blythswood Shipbuilding Co. Ltd.	Glasgow	United Kingdom	For Anglo-Saxon Petroleum Co. Ltd.
1 July	Regent Tiger	Tanker	Swan, Hunter & Wigham Richardson Ltd.	Wallsend	United Kingdom	For Bowring Steamship Co. Ltd.
4 July	Linno	L-class tug	Harland & Wolff	Belfast	United Kingdom	For Ministry of Transport.
4 July	Linyon	L-class tug	Harland & Wolff	Belfast	United Kingdom	For Ministry of Transport.
12 July	Tringa	Chanticleer-class submarine rescue ship	Savannah Machine & Foundry Co.	Savannah, Georgia	United States	
15 July	Empire Lambeth	Collier	John Crown & Sons Ltd.	Sunderland	United Kingdom	For Ministry of Transport. Compleyed as Dashwood for Wm. France, Fenwick & Co. Ltd.
15 July	Robert A. Owens	Gearing-class destroyer	Bath Iron Works	Bath, Maine	United States	
15 July	Volo	Cargo ship	Swan, Hunter & Wigham Richardson Ltd.	Newcastle upon Tyne	United Kingdom	For Ellerman's Wilson Line Ltd.
16 July	Beavercove	Cargo ship	Fairfield Shipbuilding and Engineering Co.Ltd.	Clydebank	United Kingdom	For Canadian Pacific Steamships Ltd.
27 July	Empire Kingsway	Tudor Queen type coaster	G. Brown & Co. (Marine) Ltd.	Greenock	United Kingdom	For Ministry of Shipping. Completed as The Emperor for J. Hay & Sons Ltd.
29 July	Gouldia	Tanker	Smith's Dock Co. Ltd.	North Shields	United Kingdom	For N.V. Curaçaosche Scheepsvaarts Maatschappij.
30 July	Albano	Cargo ship	William Gray & Co. Ltd.	West Hartlepool	United Kingdom	For Ellerman's Wilson Line Ltd.
30 July	Robert L. Holt	Cargo ship	Cammell Laird & Co. Ltd.	Birkenhead	United Kingdom	For John Holt & Co (Liverpool) Ltd.
31 July	Empire Tesland	Coastal tanker	Harland & Wolff Ltd	Glasgow	United Kingdom	For Ministry of Transport
1 August	Unicorn	Tench-class submarine	Electric Boat	Groton, Connecticut	United States	
10 August	Spalake	Coastal water carrier			United Kingdom	For Royal Fleet Auxiliary
12 August	Rawang	Coaster	Blyth Dry Docks & Shipbuilding Co. Ltd	Blyth, Northumberland	United Kingdom	For Straits Steamship Co. Ltd.
12 August	Turbot	Balao-class submarine	Cramp Shipbuilding Company	Philadelphia	United States	
13 August	Andrew	Amphion-class submarine	Vickers-Armstrongs	Barrow in Furness	United Kingdom	
14 August	Empire Ethelbert	Heavy lift ship	Vickers-Armstrongs	Newcastle upon Tyne	United Kingdom	For Ministry of Transport. Completed as Beljeanne for Belships Co. Ltd.
14 August	Southern Sailor	Whaler	Smith's Dock Co. Ltd.	Middlesbrough	United Kingdom	For South Georgia Co. Ltd.
15 August	Scorpion	Modified Weapon-class destroyer	J. S. White	Cowes	United Kingdom	
17 August	Limpya	L-class tug	Harland & Wolff	Belfast	United Kingdom	For Ministry of Transport.
17 August	Linda	L-class tug	Harland & Wolff	Belfast	United Kingdom	For Ministry of Transport.
26 August	Alcoa Cavalier	Victory ship	Oregon Shipbuilding Corporation	Portland, Oregon	United States	For private woner.
26 August	British Holly	Tanker	Sir James Laing & Sons Ltd.	Sunderland	United Kingdom	For British Tanker Co. Ltd.
26 August	Southern Soldier	Whaler	Smith's Dock Co. Ltd.	Middlesbrough	United Kingdom	For South Georgia Co. Ltd.
27 August	Calchas	Cargo ship	Harland & Wolff	Belfast	United Kingdom	For Blue Funnel Line.
27 August	Marjata	Cargo ship	Charles Connell & Co Ltd	Glasgow	United Kingdom	For J. Nourse Ltd.
27 August	Princess Victoria	Ferry	William Denny and Brothers Ltd.	Dumbarton	United Kingdom	For London, Midland and Scottish Railway.
27 August	Tinto	Cargo ship	Henry Robb Ltd.	Leith	United Kingdom	For Ellerman's Wilson Line Ltd.
28 August	Artemis	Amphion-class submarine	Scotts Shipbuilding & Engineering	Greenock, Scotland	United Kingdom	
28 August	Livorno	Cargo ship	William Gray & Co. Ltd.	West Hartlepool	United Kingdom	For Ellerman's Wilson Line Ltd.
28 August	Oakol	Coastal tanker			United Kingdom	For Royal Fleet Auxiliary
9 September	Rengam	Coaster	Blyth Dry Docks & Shipbuilding Co. Ltd	Blyth, Northumberland	United Kingdom	For Straits Steamship Co. Ltd.
9 September	Stockholm	Ocean liner	Götaverken	Gothenburg	Sweden	
11 September	De Grasse	Anti-aircraft cruiser	Lorient		France	
11 September	VIC 67	VIC lighter	Isaac Pimblott & Sons Ltd.	Northwich	United Kingdom	For the Admiralty.
12 September	La Hague	Cargo ship	Harland & Wolff	Belfast	United Kingdom	For Compagnie Générale Transatlantique.
12 September	Asia	Cargo ship	Sir James Laing & Sons Ltd.	Sunderland	United Kingdom	For Cunard White Star Line.
16 September	Dumra	Cargo liner	Barclay, Curle & Co. Ltd.	Glasgow	United Kingdom	For British India Steam Navigation Company.
16 September	Tanumand	Modified Warrior-type tug	Scott & Sons Ltd.	Bowling	United Kingdom	For Petroleum Steamship Co. Ltd.
18 September	VIC 68	VIC lighter	Isaac Pimblott & Sons Ltd.	Northwich	United Kingdom	Completed as Moealang for N.V. Dortsche Petroleum Maatschappij.
20 September	Walrus	Tench-class submarine	Electric Boat	Groton, Connecticut	United States	
24 September	Loch Garth	Refrigerated cargo ship	Harland & Wolff	Belfast	United Kingdom	For Royal Mail Line.
25 September	Anchises	Cargo ship	Caledon Shipbuilding & Engineering Co. Ltd.	Dundee	United Kingdom	For Ocean Steamship Co.
26 September	Louis E. Durand	Cargo ship	Shipbuilding Corporation Ltd.	Sunderland	United Kingdom	For Ministry of Transport. Completed as Chef Mecanician Durand for French Government.
26 September	Lepton	Tanker	Harland & Wolff	Belfast	United Kingdom	For Anglo-Saxon Petroleum Company.
27 September	Des Moines	Des Moines-class cruiser	Fore River Shipyard	Quincy, Massachusetts	United States	
27 September	Shahzada	Cargo ship	Lithgows Ltd.	Port Glasgow	United Kingdom	For Asiatic Steam Navigation Co. Ltd.
28 September	Alcoa Clipper	Victory ship	Oregon Shipbuilding Corporation	Portland, Oregon	United States	For private woner.
September	Cape Rodney	Cargo ship	Lithgows Ltd.	Port Glasgow	United Kingdom	For Cape of Good Hope Motorships Co. Ltd.
2 October	Waverley	Paddle Steamer	A & J Inglis Ltd	Glasgow	United Kingdom	For London and North Eastern Railway
2 October	Falaise	Ferry	William Denny and Brothers Ltd.	Dumbarton	United Kingdom	For Southern Railway`.
2 October	Iredell	Haskell-class attack transport	Oregon Shipbuilding Corporation	Portland, Oregon	United States	For United States Navy. Completed as Alcoa Corsair for private owner.
10 October	Mahronda	Cargo ship	William Hamilton & Co. Ltd.	Port Glasgow	United Kingdom	For T. & J. Brocklebank Ltd.
11 October	Lingula	Tanker	Harland & Wolff	Belfast	United Kingdom	For Anglo-Saxon Petroleum Company.
26 October	Dwarka	Passenger ship	Swan, Hunter & Wigham Richardson Ltd.	Wallsend	United Kingdom	For British India Steam Navigation Co. Ltd.
8 November	Mutlah	Cargo ship	Charles Connell & Co Ltd	Glasgow	United Kingdom	For J. Nourse Ltd.
10 November	Cyrena	Tanker	Smith's Dock Co. Ltd.	North Shields	United Kingdom	For Anglo-Saxon Petroleum Co. Ltd.
11 November	Truro	Cargo ship	Henry Robb Ltd.	Leith	United Kingdom	For Ellerman's Wilson Line Ltd.
21 November	Empire Tesville	Coastal tanker	Bartram & Sons Ltd	Sunderland	United Kingdom	For Ministry of Transport
21 November	Morbihan	Cargo ship	Harland & Wolff	Belfast	United Kingdom	For Compagnie Générale Transatlantique.
23 November	Capitaine Jean Fougere	Cargo ship	Smith's Dock Co. Ltd.	Middlesbrough	United Kingdom	For Union Industrielle & Maritime Société Française d'Armaments.
26 November	Athenic	Passenger ship	Harland & Wolff	Belfast	United Kingdom	For Shaw Savill Line.
26 November	Khanabad	Tank barge	J. Bolson & Son Ltd.	Poole	United Kingdom	For Petroleum Steamship Co. Ltd.
27 November	Loch Avon	Refrigerated cargo ship	Harland & Wolff	Belfast	United Kingdom	For Royal Mail Line.
28 November	Shansi	Cargo ship	Scotts Shipbuilding and Engineering Co. Ltd.	Greenock	United Kingdom	For China Navigation Co Ltd.
11 December	Kampala	Ocean Liner	Alexander Stephen and Sons	Glasgow	United Kingdom	For British India Steam Navigation Company
20 December	Lansdale	Gearing-class destroyer	Bethlehem Steel	San Francisco	United States	
Unknown date	Bassano	Cargo ship	Swan, Hunter & Wigham Richardson Ltd.	Newcastle upon Tyne	United Kingdom	For Ellerman's Wilson Line Ltd.
Unknown date	Bishops Foxhound	Lighter	W. J. Yarwood & Sons Ltd.	Northwich	United Kingdom	For Liverpool Lighterage Co. Ltd. and/or Bishops Wharf Carrying Co. Ltd.
Unknown date	Bishops Greyhound	Lighter	W. J. Yarwood & Sons Ltd.	Northwich	United Kingdom	For Liverpool Lighterage Co. Ltd. and/or Bishops Wharf Carrying Co. Ltd.
Unknown date	Blyth Repairer I	Launch	Blyth Dry Docks & Shipbuilding Co. Ltd	Blyth, Northumberland	United Kingdom	For private owner.
Unknown date	Crossing Knot	Type C1 ship	Southeastern Shipbuilding Corporation	Savannah, Georgia	United States	For private owner.
Unknown date	Empire Deptford	Icemaid type collier	Grangemouth Dockyard Company	Grangemouth, Stirlingshire	United Kingdom	For Ministry of Shipping. Completed as SNCF No 1 for Société Nationale D'Affrêtements.
Unknown date	Flat Knot	Type C1 ship	Southeastern Shipbuilding Corporation	Savannah, Georgia	United States	For private owner.
Unknown date	Mandovi'	Dredger	Fleming & Furguson Ltd.	Paisley	United Kingdom	For Portuguese Government.
Unknown date	Marline Bend	Type C1 ship	Southeastern Shipbuilding Corporation	Savannah, Georgia	United States	For private owner.
Unknown date	MFV-325	Naval Motor Fishing Vessel	Brooke Marine Ltd.	Lowestoft	United Kingdom	For Royal Navy.
Unknown date	MFV-436	Naval Motor Fishing Vessel	J. Bolson & Son Ltd.	Poole	United Kingdom	For Royal Navy.
Unknown date	MFV-437	Naval Motor Fishing Vessel	J. Bolson & Son Ltd.	Poole	United Kingdom	For Royal Navy.
Unknown date	MFV-438	Naval Motor Fishing Vessel	J. Bolson & Son Ltd.	Poole	United Kingdom	For Royal Navy.
Unknown date	Mouette M	Motor yacht	J. Bolson & Son Ltd.	Poole	United Kingdom	For private owner.
Unknown date	Opportune	Motor yacht	J. Bolson & Son Ltd.	Poole	United Kingdom	For private owner.
Unknown date	Shahjehan	Cargo ship	Lithgows Ltd.	Port Glasgow	United Kingdom	For Asiatic Steam Navigation Company.
Unknown date	Solid Sinnet	Type C1 ship	Southeastern Shipbuilding Corporation	Savannah, Georgia	United States	For private owner.
Unknown date	TID 169	TID-class tug	Richard Dunston Ltd.	Thorne	United Kingdom	For Ministry of Shipping.
Unknown date	TID 180	TID-class tug	William Pickersgill & Sons Ltd.	Sunderland	United Kingdom	For the Ministry of Shipping.
Unknown date	TID 181	TID-class tug	William Pickersgill & Sons Ltd.	Sunderland	United Kingdom	For the Ministry of Shipping.
Unknown date	TID 182	TID-class tug	William Pickersgill & Sons Ltd.	Sunderland	United Kingdom	For the Ministry of Shipping.
Unknown date	TID 183	TID-class tug	William Pickersgill & Sons Ltd.	Sunderland	United Kingdom	For the Ministry of Shipping.
