= USS Edisto =

USS Edisto may refer to:

- USS Edisto (CVE-41) was a Bogue-class escort carrier transferred to the Royal Navy as HMS Nabob
- USS Edisto (AGB-2) was a Wind-class icebreaker transferred to the United States Coast Guard as USCGC Edisto (WAGB-284) and decommissioned in 1974
- USCGC Edisto (WPB-1313) is an Island-class patrol boat currently in service with the United States Coast Guard
