= USCGC Staten Island =

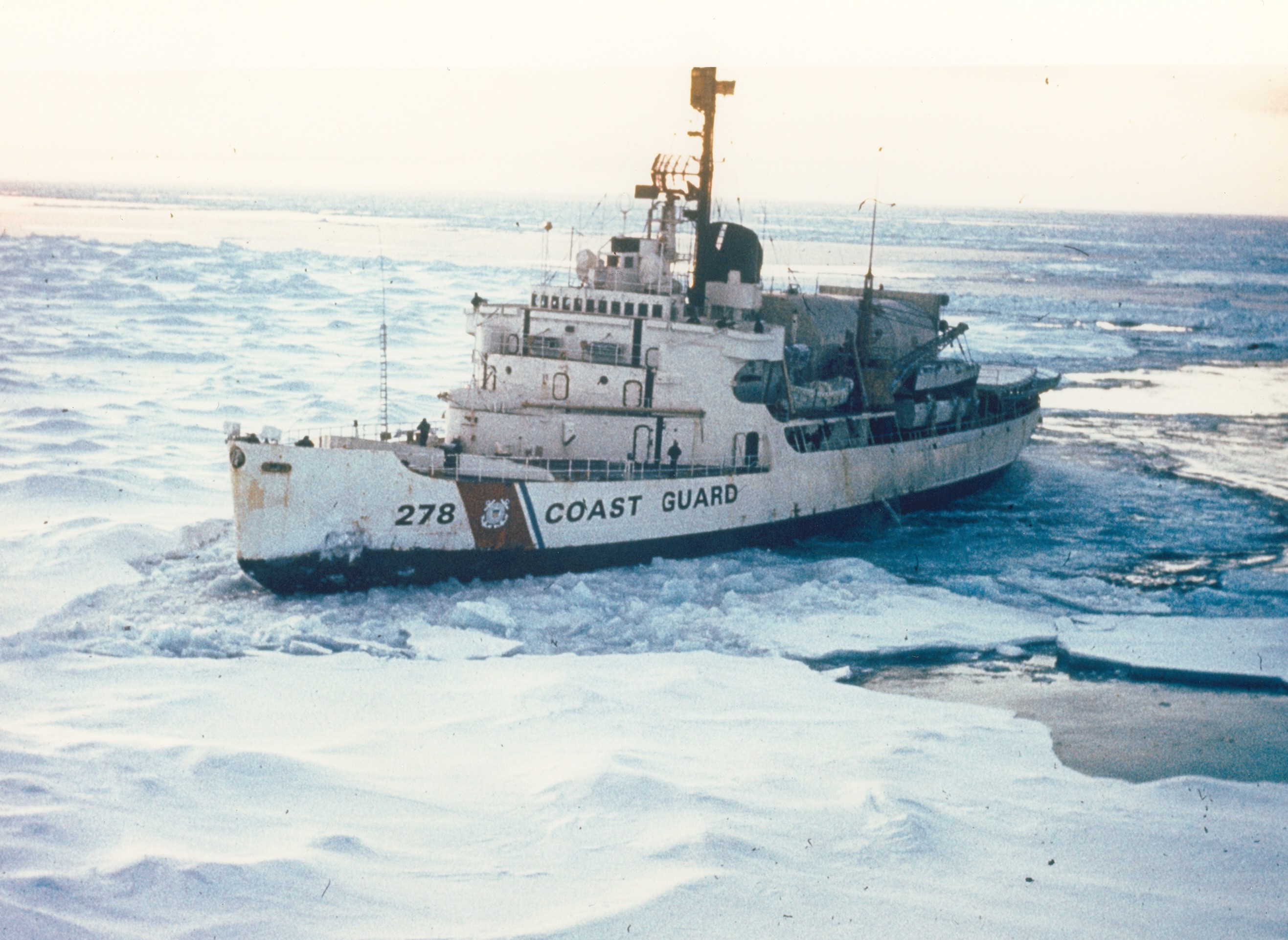
- USCGC Staten Island

History

United States
- Name: USCGC Staten Island WAG/WAGB-278
- Operator: United States Coast Guard
- Builder: Western Pipe and Steel Company
- Laid down: 9 June 1942
- Launched: 28 December 1942
- Commissioned: 26 February 1944
- Fate: Loaned to the Soviet Union

Soviet Union
- Name: Severny Veter
- Operator: Soviet Navy
- Acquired: February 1944 under Lend-Lease
- Fate: Returned to the United States

United States
- Name: USS Northwind AGB-5
- Operator: United States Navy
- Acquired: 19 December 1951
- Commissioned: 26–31 January 1952
- Decommissioned: 1 February 1966
- Renamed: USS Staten Island AGB-5, on 15 April 1952
- Stricken: 1 March 1966
- Motto: If It Can Be Done We Can Do It
- Fate: Transferred to the US Coast Guard

United States
- Name: USCGC Staten Island WAGB-278
- Acquired: 1965
- Commissioned: 1 February 1965
- Decommissioned: 15 November 1974
- Nickname(s): White Arctic Garbage Barge
- Fate: Scrapped
- Notes: Ships callsign NSXN

General characteristics
- Class & type: Wind-class icebreaker
- Displacement: 6,515 long tons (6,620 t) full load
- Length: 269 ft (82 m)
- Beam: 63 ft 6 in (19.35 m)
- Draft: 25 ft 8 in (7.82 m)
- Installed power: Diesel-electric: 6 × Fairbanks-Morse model 8-1/8OP, 10-cylinder opposed piston engines at 2,000 shp (1,500 kW), each driving a Westinghouse DC electric generator. (1944)
- Propulsion: 2 × Westinghouse Electric DC electric motors driving the 2 aft propellers, 1 × 3,000 shp (2,200 kW) Westinghouse DC electric motor driving the detachable and seldom used bow propeller.
- Speed: 16.8 knots (31.1 km/h; 19.3 mph)
- Range: 32,485 nmi (60,162 km)
- Complement: 21 officers, 295 enlisted (1942); 12 officers, 2 warrants, 205 men (1967)
- Armament: As built for USSR service: 4 × 1 3 in (76 mm)/50; 8 × 1 40 mm/60; 6 × 1 20 mm/80; 2 depth charge tracks
- Aircraft carried: 1 × Grumman J2F Duck seaplane

USCGC Staten Island (WAGB-278) was a United States Coast Guard Wind-class icebreaker. Laid down on 9 June 1942 and launched on 28 December 1942, the ship was commissioned on 26 February 1944, and almost immediately afterward transferred to the Soviet Union, under the Lend Lease program, under the name Severny Veter, which loosely translates as Northwind, until 19 December 1951. When returned to the United States Navy, she was designated USS Northwind until 15 April 1952, when she was renamed USS Staten Island to distinguish her from her successor USCGC Northwind (WAGB-282) which had been laid down shortly after she was lent to the Soviet Union. The ship was transferred to the U.S. Coast Guard as USCGC Staten Island in February 1965, and served until November 1974, before being scrapped.

== Construction ==
Staten Island was one of the icebreakers designed by Lieutenant commander Edward Thiele and Gibbs & Cox of New York, who modeled them after plans for European icebreakers he obtained before the start of World War II. She was the first of seven completed ships of the Wind-class of icebreakers operated by the United States Coast Guard. She was laid down on 9 June 1942 at Western Pipe and Steel Company shipyards in San Pedro, California, launched on 28 December 1942 and commissioned on 26 February 1944. Once commissioned, she was almost immediately transferred to the Soviet Union under the Lend-Lease program.1944.

Her hull was of unprecedented strength and structural integrity, with a relatively short length in proportion to the great power developed, a cut away forefoot, rounded bottom, and fore, aft and side heeling tanks. Diesel electric machinery was chosen for its controllability and resistance to damage.

Staten Island had her designed heavy armament reduced to four single 3"50cal., eight single 40mm., and two depth charge racks for Soviet service. After her return she received a single 5"38 cal. mount forward and a helicopter deck aft. In USCG service she had the forward mount removed.

== Service history ==
=== Soviet Union (1944–1951) ===
Severny Veter, (Russian: Северный Ветер or "North Wind"), was transferred to the Soviet Navy in February 1944 through the Lend-Lease program, serving in the Northern Route Command. In 1946 she was renamed Kapitan Belousov (Russian: Капитан Белоусов) after Soviet icebreaker commander Captain M.P. Belousov. Custody of Belousov was returned to the United States Navy on 19 December 1951 at Bremerhaven, Germany.

=== United States Navy (1951–1966) ===
On 19 December 1951 the ship was renamed USS Northwind. On 25 February 1952 the Northwind arrived at Boston Naval Shipyard, Boston, Massachusetts, for overhaul and fitting out as a unit of the United States Atlantic Fleet.

On 15 April 1952 she was renamed Staten Island to distinguish her from her successor ship USCGC Northwind (WAGB-282), which had been laid down shortly after the ship was sent to the Soviets. Staten Island was named for the New York City borough of Staten Island. Coincidentally, the major interstate highway that runs through the borough is numbered as Interstate 278.

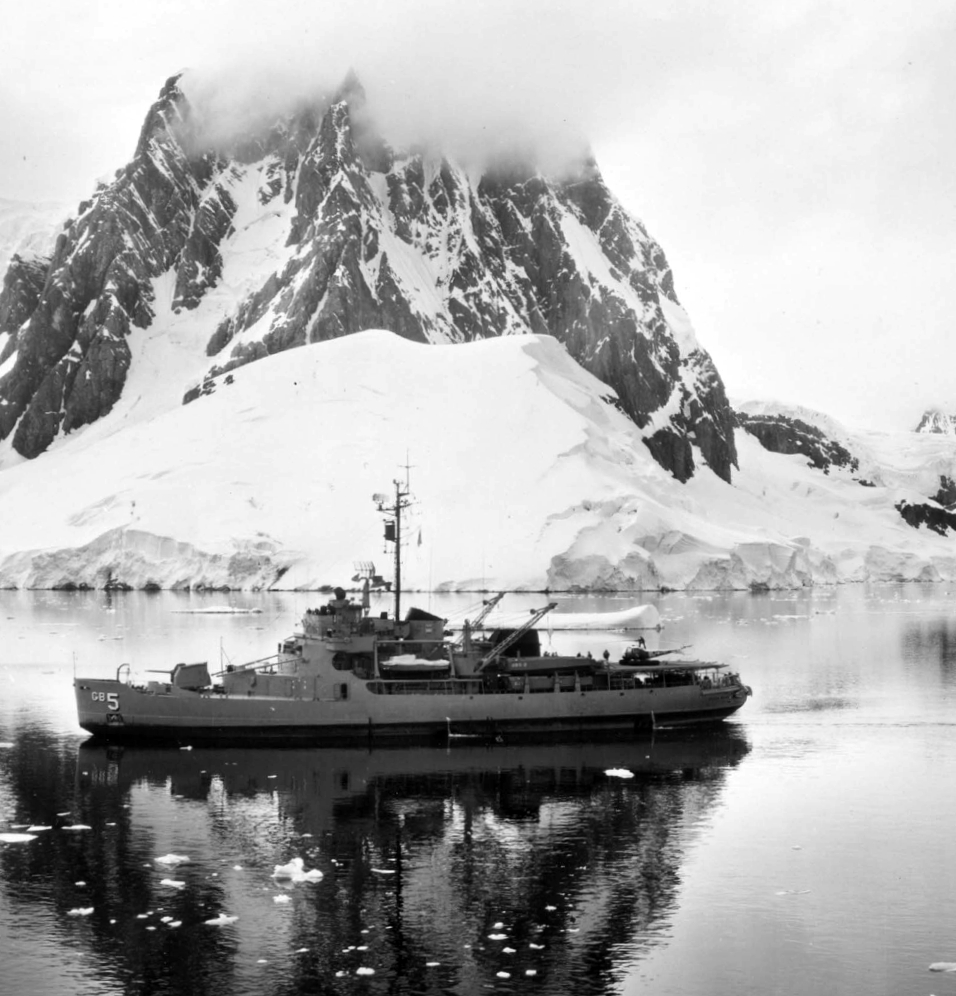
USS Staten Island (AGB-5) off the Palmer Peninsula, April 1963.

Overhaul was completed by 30 June 1952, and on 1 July 1952 she sailed from Boston to Grenfell Sound, Labrador, to conduct ice reconnaissance in Frobisher Bay, returning to Boston on 8 September.

Staten Island departed Boston for Resolution Island on 25 April 1953 to relieve Edisto (AGB-2), returning to Boston on 10 June. During August, Staten Island became the first U.S. Navy ship to cut through the Davis Strait from Thule to Ellesmere Island.

In the following year, 1954, Staten Island was involved in three ice breaking operations through 15 December 1954.

In 1955 her home port was changed to Seattle, Washington. Staten Island sailed for Seattle on 19 May 1955, and arrived there on 10 June 1955 for duty with Service Squadron 1. From June through September 1955, she broke ice for ships resupplying the Distant Early Warning Line radar stations, returning to Seattle on 28 September 1955.

Staten Island departed Seattle on 5 July 1956 to lead another convoy of resupply ships bound for the Distant Early Warning Line through the ice, returning to Seattle on 6 September 1956. She was then assigned to Operation Deep Freeze II and departed Seattle for Antarctica on 3 November 1956. Staten Island rendezvoused with cargo ship Wyandot (AKA-92) near the Panama Canal Zone before both continued on for Antarctica, arriving on 15 December 1956 at the Weddell Sea pack ice, and then breaking through the Antarctic Circle on 20 December 1956 en route to Cape Adams. The icebreaker led Wyandot from Cape Adams to Gould Bay where Ellsworth Station was then assembled. She departed Gould Bay on 15 February 1957 to return home to Seattle, arriving there on 5 April 1957.

On 15 October 1963 while on the summer Arctic mission, the captain, Commander John Metschl, and a Navy helicopter pilot were lost at sea doing ice reconnaissance. The only remains found were one of the helicopter's pontoons floating at sea.

On 1 February 1966, Staten Island was decommissioned by the United States Navy and struck from the Naval Vessel Register on 1 March 1966.

=== United States Coast Guard (1966–1974) ===
She was then transferred to the United States Coast Guard, where she was redesignated USCGC Staten Island (WAGB-278), and home-ported at Seattle. During the summer of 1966, the engineering plant was upgraded and modifications were made to the flight deck and hangar to allow operation of a HH-52A Seaguard Helicopter. The Coast Guard then deployed her to Antarctica as part of that season's "Operation Deep Freeze" on 22 September 1966.

Staten Island returned from her Antarctic voyage on 6 April 1967 and was then sent into the Arctic Ocean above Alaska for four months during the spring and summer of 1967 during which time she ran aground while traveling west from Prudhoe Bay and sustained minor damage. Staten Island then broke ice to assist her sister ship, Northwind (WAGB-282), twice during the 1967 fall ice season; in September 1967 Northwind lost a propeller and became locked in the ice, and she was trapped again in October–November 1967 450 nautical miles (830 km) north-northwest of Point Barrow, Alaska.

During July and August 1968 Staten Island was assigned to conduct an oceanographic survey of the Chukchi Sea-Bering Strait area as part of a cooperative effort between the Coast Guard Oceanographic Unit, the University of Alaska and the University of Washington.

On 10–11 March 1969, she attempted to assist in the salvage of the fishing vessel FV Martindale which had run aground off Akun Island. Disaster struck when her 26-foot self-bailing motor surf boat capsized while attempting to pass a towline from the fishing vessel Dauntless to Martindale, resulting in the death of her deck division chief, BMC Elias Welch. The surf boat was later salvaged using the cutter's landing craft (LCVP) and the crew of Martindale evacuated.

Staten Island was dispatched to the Arctic Ocean on 7 July 1969 as an oceanographic research platform and escort vessel for supply operations. There she helped Storis (WMEC-38) reach open water off Point Barrow on 7 September 1969, relieved Northwind on 22 September 1969 after that vessel suffered engine trouble, and assisted the Canadian icebreaker CCGS John A. Macdonald in escorting the tanker SS Manhattan eastward through the Northwest Passage. Staten Island arrived in New York on 9 November 1969, and departed for Seattle on 9 December 1969 by way of the Panama Canal with stops in San Juan, Puerto Rico, and Acapulco, Mexico. Upon her arrival back in Seattle, Staten Island became the fourth United States ship to circumnavigate the North American continent, traveling over 23,000 miles (37,000 km) in the process.

She departed Seattle on 6 July 1970 to conduct scientific tests and evaluation of crude oil spread rate in the Arctic Ocean. Later that summer when a large group of 20 tugboats and 40 barges bound for Prudhoe Bay with vital supplies became trapped in pack ice, Staten Island worked around the clock for 3 1/2 days to tow and push the barges to open water. She freed the fouled screw of the tugboat Active 30 nautical miles (56 km) southwest of Point Barrow on 14 August 1970, and returned to Seattle on 20 August 1970. Staten Island departed Seattle once more later in 1970 as part of "Operation Deep Freeze 1971".

On 28 February 1971, while en route to Mawson Station she struck an uncharted pinnacle 14 nautical miles (26 km) north of the station, suffering significant damage, including a punctured hull that flooded four compartments, but no crew injuries. After completing temporary repairs in Melbourne, Australia and certified seaworthy, USCGC Burton Island was ordered to escort Staten Island home to Seattle.

In mid-March 1972, during "Operation Deep Freeze", while en route from Dunedin, New Zealand, to Suva, Fiji, Staten Island was broadsided by a rogue wave and came within 2 degrees of capsizing. While ascending the ladder to the bridge to relieve the helmsman, Seaman Cotten hailed the Officer of the Deck moments before an 80 ft (24 m) wall of water struck the port beam. With the bridge doors open the bridge instantly filled with water, as well as the stairwell in which Seaman Cotten was prevented from ascending. The ship listed heavily to starboard, began to shake with one propeller turning in the air, then rolled back to port causing the starboard wing to scoop up seawater, sending everyone splashing toward the overhead (again). Only one man was injured; a fireman climbing up from the engine room who twisted an ankle. In early March 1972 Staten Island became the first United States government vessel to enter the port in Dunedin.

Later in 1972 the ship departed Seattle for Arctic Summer North carrying scientists from the University of Anchorage, the University of Washington, and the Smithsonian Institution to make determinations on the effects drilling for oil on the north slope of Alaska would have on the environment.

During February 1973 Staten Island participated in the Bering Sea Experiment as part of her Arctic West Winter activities, 475 nautical miles (880 km) north of Adak Island, with the Soviet research vessel Priboy, and several aircraft. From 7 March through 3 April 1973, she was attached to Task Unit 57.0 of the Pacific Fleet during SUBICEX 1-73. Completing her SUBICEX assignments she sailed south and while leaving the frozen sections of the Bering Sea she took heavy swells over her bow including large chunks of ice that damaged her superstructure. On 4 April 1973 her starboard main electric drive motor caught fire. With that motor out of commission her port motor remained in service as she limped into Kodiak, Alaska and finally onto Seattle arriving 12 April 1973. Staten Island was drydocked for repairs the remainder of that summer.

Staten Island departed Seattle 31 October 1973 for San Diego where her crew received refresher training between 5 and 16 November 1973, at which time she departed to escort ships in "Operation Deep Freeze 1974". Staten Island helped rescue USNS Maumee when her rudder became damaged in the heavy ice at McMurdo. The Staten Island crew freed the rudder from its jammed position at 90 degrees and fixed the rudder with a rudimentary manual steering gear allowing Maumee to make her way to New Zealand for repairs. Staten Island returned from Antarctica to Seattle via stops in Chile, Peru, and Mexico during April 1974. In August and September 1974 Staten Island conducted her final deployment. Her crew completed the Arctic West Summer activities, thereby capping a 30-year ice breaking career in the polar regions of the world.

Staten Island was decommissioned on 15 November 1974, and sold for scrap.

== Awards ==
Staten Island was awarded the Coast Guard Unit Commendation with Operational Distinguishing Device for the periods of 23 September–8 October 1967, 21 September–1 November 1969 and 7 March 1973 – 3 April 1973. From 12 December 1970 through 10 March 1971, Staten Island participated in Task Force 43, along with USCGC Edisto, USCGC Glacier and USCGC Westwind, for which she was awarded the Navy Meritorious Unit Commendation. She was awarded another Navy Meritorious Unit Commendation for her service in Task Force 43 from 5 December 1973 through 22 February 1974. Staten Island also earned two awards of the National Defense Service Medal

Coast Guard Unit Commendation with Operational Distinguishing Device and 2 award stars	Coast Guard Meritorious Unit Commendation with Operational Distinguishing Device	Navy Meritorious Unit Commendation with one star
World War II Victory Medal	National Defense Service Medal (2nd)	Antarctica Service Medal
