= List of ship commissionings in 1944 =

The list of ship commissionings in 1944 includes a chronological list of ships commissioned in 1944. In cases where no official commissioning ceremony was held, the date of service entry may be used instead.

Date	Operator	Ship	Class and type	Notes
January 3	United States Navy	USS Nehenta Bay	Casablanca-class escort carrier	
January 11	United States Navy	USS Hoggatt Bay	Casablanca-class escort carrier	
January 17	Royal Navy	HMS Rajah	Attacker-class escort carrier	Ex-USS Prince acquired through Lend-Lease
January 18	United States Navy	USS Kadashan Bay	Casablanca-class escort carrier	
January 26	United States Navy	USS Marcus Island	Casablanca-class escort carrier	
January 31	United States Navy	USS Franklin	Essex-class aircraft carrier	
January 31	United States Navy	USS Proteus	Fulton-class submarine tender	
January 31	Royal Navy	HMS Trouncer	Attacker-class escort carrier	Ex-USS Perdido acquired through Lend-Lease
February 3	United States Navy	USS Savo Island	Casablanca-class escort carrier	
February 5	Royal Navy	HMS Puncher	Bogue-class escort carrier	Ex-USS Willapa crewed by the Royal Canadian Navy
February 5	United States Navy	USS Shackle	Diver-class rescue and salvage ship	
February 11	United States Navy	USS Ommaney Bay	Casablanca-class escort carrier	
February 18	United States Navy	USS Petrof Bay	Casablanca-class escort carrier	
February 18	Royal Navy	HMS Reaper	Attacker-class escort carrier	Ex-USS Winjah acquired through Lend-Lease
February 21	United States Navy	USS Chowanoc	Abnaki-class fleet ocean tug	
February 26	United States Navy	USS Rudyerd Bay	Casablanca-class escort carrier	
February 26	United States Coast Guard	USCGC Staten Island	Wind-class icebreaker	
March 1	United States Navy	USS Saginaw Bay	Casablanca-class escort carrier	
March 9	United States Navy	USS Sargent Bay	Casablanca-class escort carrier	
March 15	United States Navy	USS Shamrock Bay	Casablanca-class escort carrier	
March 21	United States Navy	USS Shipley Bay	Casablanca-class escort carrier	
March 25	United States Navy	USS Cocopa	Abnaki-class fleet ocean tug	
March 28	United States Navy	USS Sitkoh Bay	Casablanca-class escort carrier	
April 4	United States Navy	USS Steamer Bay	Casablanca-class escort carrier	
April 8	United States Navy	USS Cape Esperance	Casablanca-class escort carrier	
April 15	United States Navy	USS Hancock	Essex-class aircraft carrier	
April 15	United States Navy	USS Takanis Bay	Casablanca-class escort carrier	
April 16	United States Navy	USS Wisconsin	Iowa-class battleship	
April 18	United States Navy	USS Abarenda	floating storage tanker	Ex-Acme, commissioned in New Caledonia under command of Lt. Commander Benjamin F. Langland, USCGR
April 21	United States Navy	USS Thetis Bay	Casablanca-class escort carrier	
April 27	United States Navy	USS Makassar Strait	Casablanca-class escort carrier	
May 3	United States Navy	USS Windham Bay	Casablanca-class escort carrier	
May 8	United States Navy	USS Ticonderoga	Essex-class aircraft carrier	
May 9	United States Navy	USS Makin Island	Casablanca-class escort carrier	
May 14	United States Navy	USS Lunga Point	Casablanca-class escort carrier	
May 20	United States Navy	USS Bismarck Sea	Casablanca-class escort carrier	
May 26	United States Navy	USS Salamaua	Casablanca-class escort carrier	
June 1	United States Navy	USS Hollandia	Casablanca-class escort carrier	
June 3	United States Coast Guard	USCGC Eastwind	Wind-class icebreaker	
June 7	United States Navy	USS Kwajalein	Casablanca-class escort carrier	
June 11	United States Navy	USS Missouri	Iowa-class battleship	
June 13	United States Navy	USS Admiralty Islands	Casablanca-class escort carrier	
June 18	United States Navy	USS Bougainville	Casablanca-class escort carrier	
June 24	United States Navy	USS Matanikau	Casablanca-class escort carrier	
June 30	United States Navy	USS Attu	Casablanca-class escort carrier	
July 6	United States Navy	USS Roi	Casablanca-class escort carrier	
July 8	United States Navy	USS Munda	Casablanca-class escort carrier	
July 15	United States Navy	USCGC Southwind	Wind-class icebreaker	
July 16	Soviet Navy	Jivoochyi	Wickes-class destroyer	Ex-HMS Richmond and USS Fairfax
August 6	United States Navy	USS Bennington	Essex-class aircraft carrier	
September 15	United States Navy	USS Shangri-La	Essex-class aircraft carrier	
September 15	Royal Navy	HMS Vivid	British V-class submarine	
September 16	United States Navy	USS Tawakoni	Abnaki-class fleet ocean tug	
September 18	United States Coast Guard	USCGC Westwind	Wind-class icebreaker	
October 9	United States Navy	USS Randolph	Essex-class aircraft carrier	
October 28	United States Navy	USS Aaron Ward	Robert H. Smith-class destroyer minelayer	Under command of Commander William H. Sanders Jr.
November 26	United States Navy	USS Bon Homme Richard	Essex-class aircraft carrier	
November 27	United States Navy	USS Commencement Bay	Commencement Bay-class escort carrier	
December 20	United States Coast Guard	USCGC Mackinaw	Great Lakes icebreaker	
December 30	United States Navy	USS Block Island	Commencement Bay-class escort carrier	
