= Victualling Inshore Craft =

Auxiliary vessel of Royal Navy during WW II

The Victualling Inshore Craft, or VIC, was a type of auxiliary vessel built for the Royal Navy during the Second World War. The VIC was modelled on the Clyde puffer, and over 100 were built during the conflict.

== Background ==
During the First World War the Royal Navy had need of an auxiliary vessel suitable for lightering supplies to its ships in a variety of settings, often with insufficient, or completely without, shore facilities. Numerous civilian vessels were requisitioned, but the type found most suitable was the Clyde puffer. This was a small, coal-fired, steam ship, with a comparatively large hold and equipped with a derrick for unloading. The puffers were employed ferrying all manner of supplies around the Firth of Clyde and Scotland's west coast, where small communities had limited, or no, harbour facilities.

== Design ==
With the outbreak of the Second World War, and the decline in numbers of the puffers during the 1930s, led the Admiralty to order the Victualling Inshore Craft, to a design based on two recent puffers, the Hay boats Anzac and Lascar. These were both coal-fired and steam-powered, limiting the pressure on supplies of fuel oil and diesel, though later VICs were diesel-powered. The puffers were typically divided into "shorehead" (or coastal) boats, with a maximum length of 66 feet (20 m), and "outside" (sea-going) boats, of 80 feet (24 m). The shorehead boats were within the dimensions of the Forth & Clyde Canal sealocks, making it possible for them to enter the inland waterway system, though the outside boats were more suited to the Atlantic conditions off the west coast.

== Construction ==
Some 107 VICs were ordered by the Admiralty; of these four were later cancelled, and four others were unfinished at the war's end, being completed for merchant service. Of the 99 in RN service, 63 were of the coastal (66 ft (20 m)) type, and 36 (mostly later) of the sea-going (80 ft (24 m)) type. The majority, 88, were steam-powered, while 11 (9 coastal, and 2 sea-going) had diesel engines.

While the puffer was a Scottish design, the Clyde shipyards were fully occupied with building and repairing ships for the Merchant and the Royal Navys, so the VICs were built at river and canal yards in England. The main yards involved were Dunston, of Thorne, South Yorkshire (40 in total built) and Pimblotts of Northwich (28). Other yards employed were S&D Brown, of Hull; Watson, of Gainsborough; Pollock, of Faversham; Richards, of Lowestoft; Harker, of Knottingley; Goole Shipbuilding and Rowhedge Ironworks.

== Service history ==
The VICs were employed at RN harbours and anchorages around the coast of Britain, lightering all manner of supplies as needed. Their largely unsung work was nonetheless vital to the smooth running of naval operations. With the war's end the VICs were sold into merchant service, many being employed on the Clyde into the late 1940s and '50s.
