= USCGC Westwind =

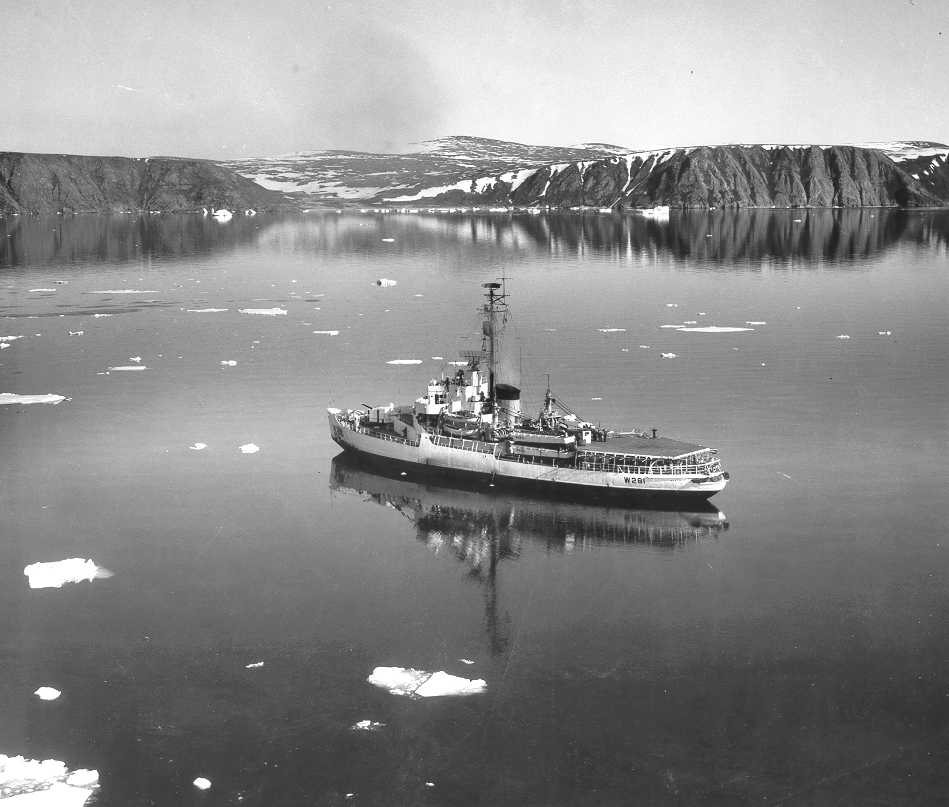
- USCGC Westwind near Cape Atholl, Greenland.

History

United States
- Name: USS Westwind
- Builder: Western Pipe and Steel Company, San Pedro, California.
- Laid down: 24 August 1942.
- Launched: 31 March 1943.
- Sponsored by: Mrs. Stanley V. Parker.
- Commissioned: 18 September 1944.
- Identification: AGB-6
- Fate: Lent to U.S.S.R.
- Notes: Designed by Gibbs & Cox of New York.

Soviet Union
- Name: Severniy Polyus (Russian: Северный Полюс, "North Pole").
- Acquired: 21 February 1945
- Fate: Returned to U.S.
- Notes: Lend-Lease. Some Russian identification labels and plaques remained on ship's equipment after being returned to U.S. service.

United States
- Name: USCGC Westwind
- Operator: U.S. Coast Guard
- Acquired: 19 December 1951
- Decommissioned: 29 February 1988
- Identification: Hull number: WAGB-281; Call sign: NLKL
- Motto: We may be old, but we still run
- Nickname(s): "Big Red of the Gulf Coast," "Big Red Pig," "Floating Football," "Wandering Arctic Garbage Barge"
- Fate: Scrapped

General characteristics
- Class & type: Wind-class icebreaker
- Displacement: 6,515 long tons (6,620 t) full load
- Length: 269 ft (82 m)
- Beam: 63 ft 6 in (19.35 m)
- Draft: 25 feet, 9 inches.
- Installed power: Diesel-electric: 6 × Fairbanks-Morse model 8-1/8OP, 10-cylinder opposed piston engines at 2,000 shp (1,500 kW), each driving a Westinghouse DC electric generator (1944); 4 × Enterprise / deLaval engines (1975)
- Propulsion: 2 × Westinghouse Electric DC electric motors driving the 2 aft propellers, 1 × 3,000 shp (2,200 kW) Westinghouse DC electric motor driving the detachable and seldom used bow propeller.
- Speed: 15.5 kn (28.7 km/h; 17.8 mph)
- Range: 16,000 nmi (30,000 km; 18,000 mi) at 16 knots (30 km/h; 18 mph) as designed; 16,000 nmi (30,000 km; 18,000 mi) at 10–12 knots (19–22 km/h; 12–14 mph) as built
- Capacity: Approximately 450,000 U.S. gal (1,700,000 L) diesel fuel
- Complement: World War II authorized: 316 (21 officers, 295 enlisted); World War II 1944: 350; Postwar (US): 175 (13 officers, 2 warrant officers, 160 enlisted.
- Armament: Main: 4 × Mark 12 DP 5"/38 caliber guns on two twin mounts (1 forward, 1 aft); Anti-air: 12 × Bofors 40 mm guns on three quadruple mounts, 6 × Oerlikon 20 mm cannons on single mounts.; Anti-sub: 1 × Hedgehog projector, 2 × depth charge racks.

USCGC Westwind (WAGB-281) was a Wind-class icebreaker that served in the United States Coast Guard as USCGC Westwind (WAG-281), the Soviet Navy as the Severni Polius, and again in the U.S. Coast Guard as USCGC Westwind (WAGB-281).

== Construction ==
Westwind was one of the icebreakers designed by Lieutenant commander Edward Thiele and Gibbs & Cox of New York, who modeled them after plans for European icebreakers he obtained before the start of World War II. She was the fourth of seven completed ships of the Wind class of icebreakers operated by the United States Coast Guard. Her keel was laid on 24 March 1942 at Western Pipe and Steel Company shipyards in San Pedro. She was launched on 31 March 1943 and commissioned on 18 September 1944.

Wind-class icebreakers had hulls of unprecedented strength and structural integrity, with a relatively short length in proportion to the great power developed, a cut away forefoot, rounded bottom, and fore, aft and side heeling tanks. Diesel electric machinery was chosen for its controllability and resistance to damage.

Westwind, along with the other Wind-class icebreakers, was heavily armed for an icebreaker due to her design being crafted during World War II. Her main battery consisted of two twin-mount 5 in (130 mm) deck guns. Her anti-aircraft weaponry consisted of three quad-mounted Bofors 40 mm anti-aircraft autocannons. and six Oerlikon 20 mm autocannons. She also carried six K-gun depth charge projectors and a Hedgehog as anti-submarine weapons. After her return from Soviet service she received a single 5"38 cal. mount forward and a helicopter deck aft. Sometime after 1966 she had the forward mount removed.

== History ==
The ship's keel was laid at Western Pipe & Steel, San Pedro, California, USA, on 24 August 1942. It was launched from San Pedro on 31 March 1943, and commissioned as the USS Westwind (AGB-6) on 18 September 1944. On 21 February 1945 the ship was transferred to the Soviet Union and renamed Severni Polius (North Pole, Russian: Северный Полюс).

On 19 December 1951, the ship was returned to the United States Coast Guard, and recommissioned as the Westwind on 22 September 1952 after a refit. Starting 30 September 1954, the ship participated in a 121-day Arctic cruise, returning to New York Harbor, Brooklyn Navy Yard. In 1955 the Westwind called at Bouvetøya in the Southern Ocean at the request of the South African government. Between 1956 and 1957, the ship was engaged in DEWLINE support Operations in the Arctic.

In 1962, the ship was part of SUNEC '62 - hull stress tests conducted for the design of future Icebreakers. In 1964 the Westwind arrived in the area of United States Coast Guard LORAN Station Cape Atholl, Greenland, returning from this Arctic cruise on 18 August of that year. On 22 June 1966 the ship crossed the Arctic Circle at 52N 03W on SUNEC66 Supply Northeast Command out of Thule, Greenland. On 3 March 1967, as part of Deep Freeze 67, the ship crossed the Antarctic Circle at 67S 36W and assisted Navy Seabees building a scientific station on Palmer Peninsula. In March and April 1969 and March and April 1970, Westwind broke ice on the Great Lakes to hasten the start of the shipping season there. From June to September 1970 the ship was on Arctic East Deployment.

Between 1974 and 1975 the ship underwent an extensive refit to strengthen the bow, replace engines, change propeller shafts, and received a new "Icebreaker Red" paint scheme. From 1975 to 1981 the ship's homeport was Milwaukee, Wisconsin. During this period the ship embarked on Summer North Trips to the Arctic Circle via Montreal, St. John's, Newfoundland, and on to Thule, Greenland for summer breakouts.

On 13 December 1977, during a preliminary test run for Winter Breakouts in the Great Lakes, it ran aground at Seven Foot Shoals, near the entrance to St. Mary's River, Lake Huron. The resulting 64-by-2-foot (19.51 by 0.61 m) gash and bent propeller shaft was repaired at a dry dock in Montreal over a period of 4 months. The summer of 1978 saw another Arctic trip, doing mapping and marine science along the northeastern coast of Greenland. On 29 August 1979 [Coast Guard Day], again in the Arctic, the Westwind reached 83.45 degrees North Latitude, the farthest any U.S. surface vessel had ever penetrated.

In 1982 the ship was involved in an operation out of Mobile, Alabama, the Haitian Migration Interdiction Operation (HMIO). Following this operation, Cutter Westwind's home port changed to Mobile. In 1984, the Westwind sustained major hull damage in the Weddell Sea on a Deep Freeze cruise. A 6-foot (1.8 m) tall, 140-foot (43 m) long tear in the hull was temporarily patched by the crew until it could be repaired in South America. In 1986, funding cuts reduced operating funds for icebreakers, ending plans to refit the Westwind. The ship was finally decommissioned on 28 February 1988.

== Notes ==
Sources disagree on the exact date that Westwind was transferred to the Soviet Union under the Lend-lease program. The Dictionary of American Naval Fighting Ships (DANFS) lists Westwind's date of transfer as 21 February 1945, while the United States Coast Guard's history site is ambiguous, stating only that Westwind was transferred in 1945. A crew museum website lists the transfer date as Thanksgiving day 1945.

It is believed that the final disposition of the Westwind was sale for scrap based on a former crewman's report. The crewman, transferred to the USCGC Polar Sea returning from Antarctica in 1988, saw the Westwind and the CCGS Labrador moored to a pier in Honolulu. The two dead ships were en route to Far Eastern ship scrappers when the consort tugboat broke down.

== See also ==
- Goettel Escarpment - named for the ship's commanding officer.
