= CCGS Labrador =

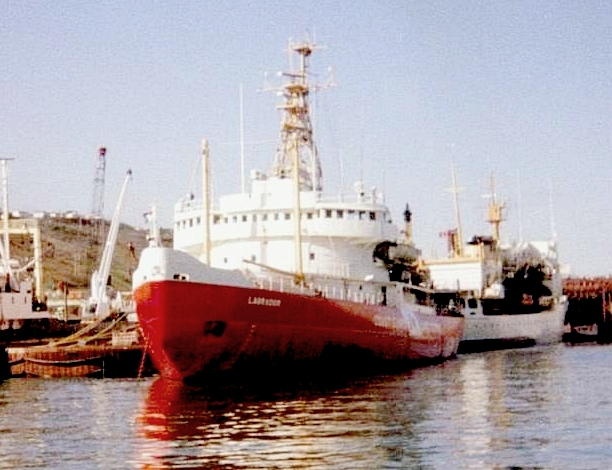
- CCGS Labrador

History

Canada
- Name: Labrador
- Namesake: Labrador
- Owner: Government of Canada
- Operator: Royal Canadian Navy; Department of Transport; Canadian Coast Guard
- Builder: Marine Industries Ltd., Sorel
- Yard number: 187
- Laid down: 18 November 1949
- Launched: 14 December 1951
- Commissioned: 8 July 1954
- Maiden voyage: 23 July 1954
- Renamed: 1210 (1988)
- Refit: January 1955
- Home port: Halifax, Nova Scotia
- Identification: Pennant number AW 50; IMO number: 5201336; Call sign CGVM (RCN)/ CGGM (CCG)
- Fate: Broken up 1989

General characteristics
- Class & type: Wind-class icebreaker
- Tonnage: 3,823 GRT
- Displacement: 6,490 long tons (6,590 t)
- Length: 82 m (269 ft 0 in) oa; 76.2 m (250 ft 0 in) pp
- Beam: 19.5 m (64 ft 0 in)
- Draught: 8.8 m (28 ft 10 in)
- Ice class: Arctic Class 2–3
- Installed power: 6 × 10-cylinder diesel engines (6 × 2,000 bhp (1,500 kW))
- Propulsion: Diesel-electric; two shafts (2 × 5,000 hp (3,700 kW))
- Speed: 16 knots (30 km/h; 18 mph)
- Complement: 228
- Aircraft carried: Two Bell HTL-4 single-rotor helicopters, or one Piasecki HUP II twin-rotor helicopter.
- Aviation facilities: Hangar and flight deck
- Notes: Registry #1 310129 Registry #2 CN

CCGS Labrador was a Wind-class icebreaker. First commissioned on 8 July 1954 as Her Majesty's Canadian Ship (HMCS) Labrador (pennant number AW 50) in the Royal Canadian Navy (RCN), Captain O.C.S. "Long Robbie" Robertson, GM, RCN, in command. She was transferred to the Department of Transport (DOT) on 22 November 1957, and re-designated Canadian Government Ship (CGS) Labrador. She was among the DOT fleet assigned to the nascent Canadian Coast Guard (CCG) when that organization was formed in 1962, and further re-designated Canadian Coast Guard Ship (CCGS) Labrador. She extensively charted and documented the then-poorly-known Canadian Arctic, and as HMCS Labrador was the first ship to circumnavigate North America in a single voyage. The ship was taken out of service in 1987 and broken up for scrap in 1989.

== Description ==
The builder used modified plans from the just-completed Wind-class icebreakers of the United States Coast Guard. The ship was modified to include then state-of-the-art technology, becoming the first Royal Canadian Navy vessel to have central heating and ventilation, air conditioning and bunks instead of hammocks. The ship's hull was plated in rolled, high tensile steel 1 5/8 inches (41 mm) thick.

The ship had a displacement of 6,490 long tons (6,590 t) and a tonnage of 3,823 gross register tons (GRT). The vessel measured 82 metres (269 ft 0 in) long overall and 76.2 metres (250 ft 0 in) between perpendiculars with a beam of 19.5 metres (64 ft 0 in) and a draught of 8.8 m (28 ft 10 in).

Labrador was equipped with Denny Brown gyro stabilizers, and full bridge control of the vessel's diesel engines. Labrador was the RCN's first fully diesel-electric vessel, with six 2,000 horsepower (1,500 kW) engine/generators driving a 5,000 shaft horsepower (3,700 kW) motor on each shaft. The vessel had a maximum speed of 16 knots (30 km/h; 18 mph) Labrador was equipped with starboard and port heeling tanks with 40,000 gallons per minute transfer capability, which facilitated icebreaking operations. The ship was equipped with a hangar and flight deck capable of operating two Bell HTL 4 light helicopters or a Piasecki HUP II transport helicopter. The icebreaker had a complement of 228.

== Service history ==
Throughout the first half of the 20th century, the Canadian government made limited exploration within the vast Arctic coast it laid claim to, largely because it lacked the capacity to make forays into much of this remote terrain. Labrador was conceived as Canada's first modern, powerful icebreaking vessel, which could help meet national defence needs in the high Arctic but also explore the vast area and its rich resources.

Ordered in February 1949, Labrador was built in the Marine Industries LTD yards at Sorel, Quebec with the yard number 187. The vessel was laid down on 18 November 1949 and launched on 14 December 1951, christened by Jeanne St. Laurent, the wife of Prime Minister Louis St. Laurent. The ship was commissioned on 8 July 1954. On 10 July 1954 Labrador departed Sorel, Quebec, en route to her new homeport in Dartmouth, Nova Scotia. Whilst underway the vessel experienced engine troubles (lowered oil pressure), between Sorel and Quebec City, Quebec. Further difficulty was experienced in the Richelieu River, where she developed steering gear problems which were fixed. Labrador arrived at Halifax on 14 July 1954.

=== Royal Canadian Navy service ===
Labrador set sail on her maiden voyage on 23 July 1954 from Halifax, bound for the Labrador Sea. Over the next summer the vessel worked her way through Canada's Arctic archipelago from east to west, conducting hydrographic soundings, resupplying RCMP outposts and deploying assorted scientific and geological teams. Her rendezvous with her American sister ships USCGC Northwind and USCGC Burton Island off the coast of Melville Island on 25 August 1954 marked the first time American and Canadian government ships had met in the Arctic from the east and west. Labrador had been sent to escort the American vessels through Canadian waters. The voyage had been kept secret, in case Labrador broke down. The three ships surveyed the Beaufort Sea together until the end of September 1954, at which point Labrador headed for the base of Canada's Pacific fleet at Esquimalt, British Columbia, arriving on 27 September. Labrador became the first warship to transit the Northwest Passage. Upon sailing down the west coast of the United States, through the Panama Canal and back to Halifax on 21 November 1954; Labrador also became the first warship to circumnavigate North America in a single voyage.

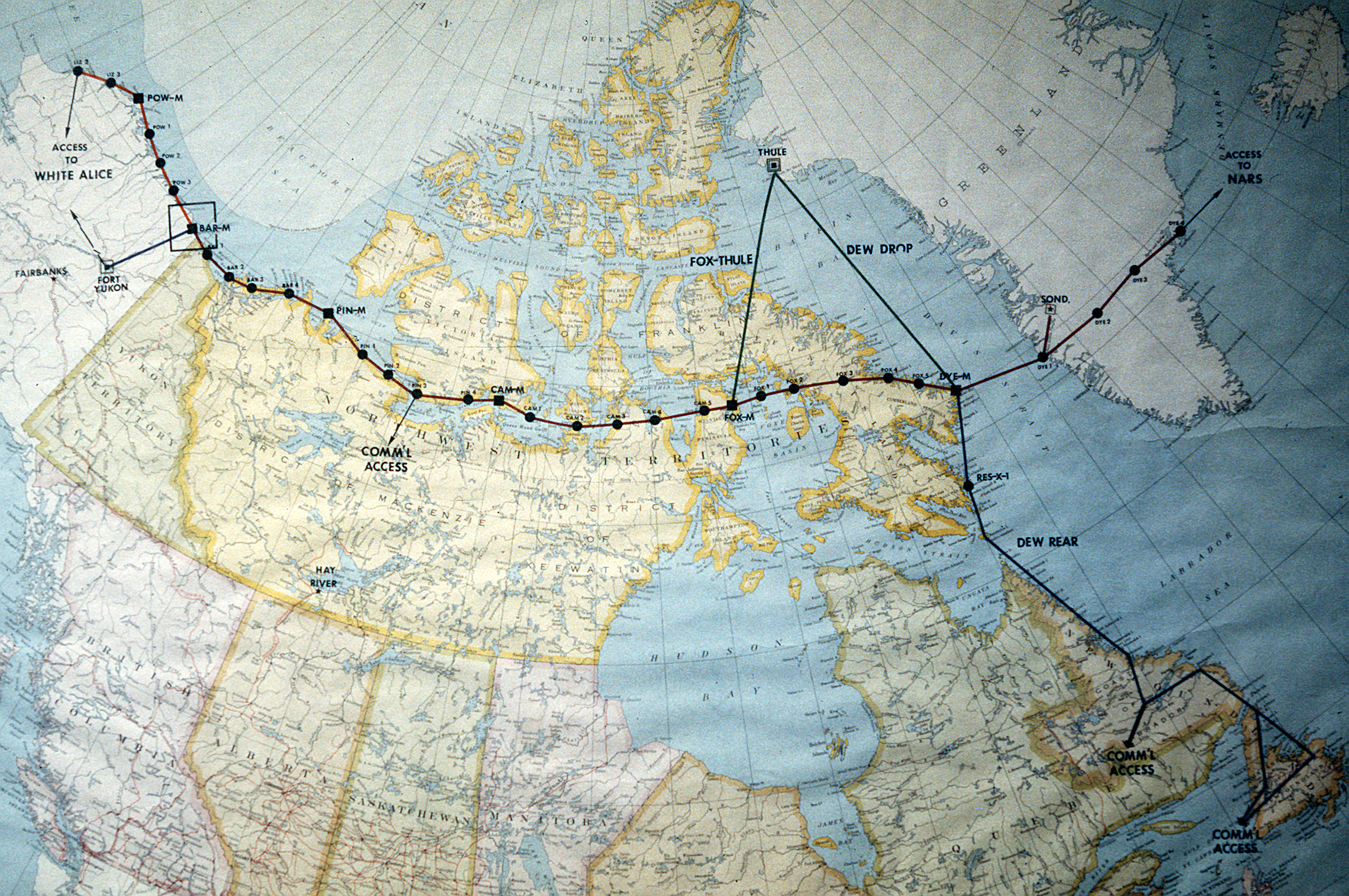
Map of Distant Early Warning (DEW) Line

In January 1955 Labrador underwent refit. The remainder of Labrador's early career involved considerable work on the Distant Early Warning Line (DEW Line) project. Beginning in June 1955, Labrador was sent to survey sites for the project. In August, Labrador escorted a 60-ship convoy. In 1956, the icebreaker spent five and a half months performing hydrographic surveys in the eastern Arctic. In 1957, the ship made port visits to Portsmouth, England, Oslo, Norway and Copenhagen, Denmark. Labrador was decommissioned on 22 November 1957 and transferred to civilian control in 1958. This was done with the condition that should the Royal Canadian Navy wish to take the ship back, they could. The decision was due to financial cutbacks a change of direction of the Royal Canadian Navy, with an intent to focus on anti-submarine warfare rather than Arctic research.

=== Civilian service ===
On entering civilian service, the icebreaker operated within the Department of Transport (DOT) during the four years before the Canadian Coast Guard (CCG) was formally established. From 1958 until 1977, Labrador deployed to the Arctic every year. In 1964, Labrador reached the most northerly position ever attained by a Canadian vessel to that point when the ship passed Hans Island. During winter months, the icebreaker would perform icebreaking operations in the lower St. Lawrence River.

In 1974, Labrador was sent to Arctic waters to carry out hydrographic survey work. From 1977 onward, Labrador was used primarily for hydrographic survey work. In 1979, the icebreaker took part in the search for the sunken merchant vessel Breadalbane. The site of the wreck was found during the expedition, but the sunken vessel's identity was not confirmed until the following year. During the ship's final years, Labrador was restricted to southern waters due to metal fatigue and worked in the Gulf of St. Lawrence during the winter. Labrador was taken out of service in 1987 and replaced by CCGS Henry Larsen. The vessel was renamed 1210 in 1988 and sold for scrap to Chi Hsiang Steel Enterprise Co Ltd. The vessel was taken to Kaohsiung, Taiwan, arriving on 24 June 1989 with work beginning on the dismantling of the ship on 29 July.

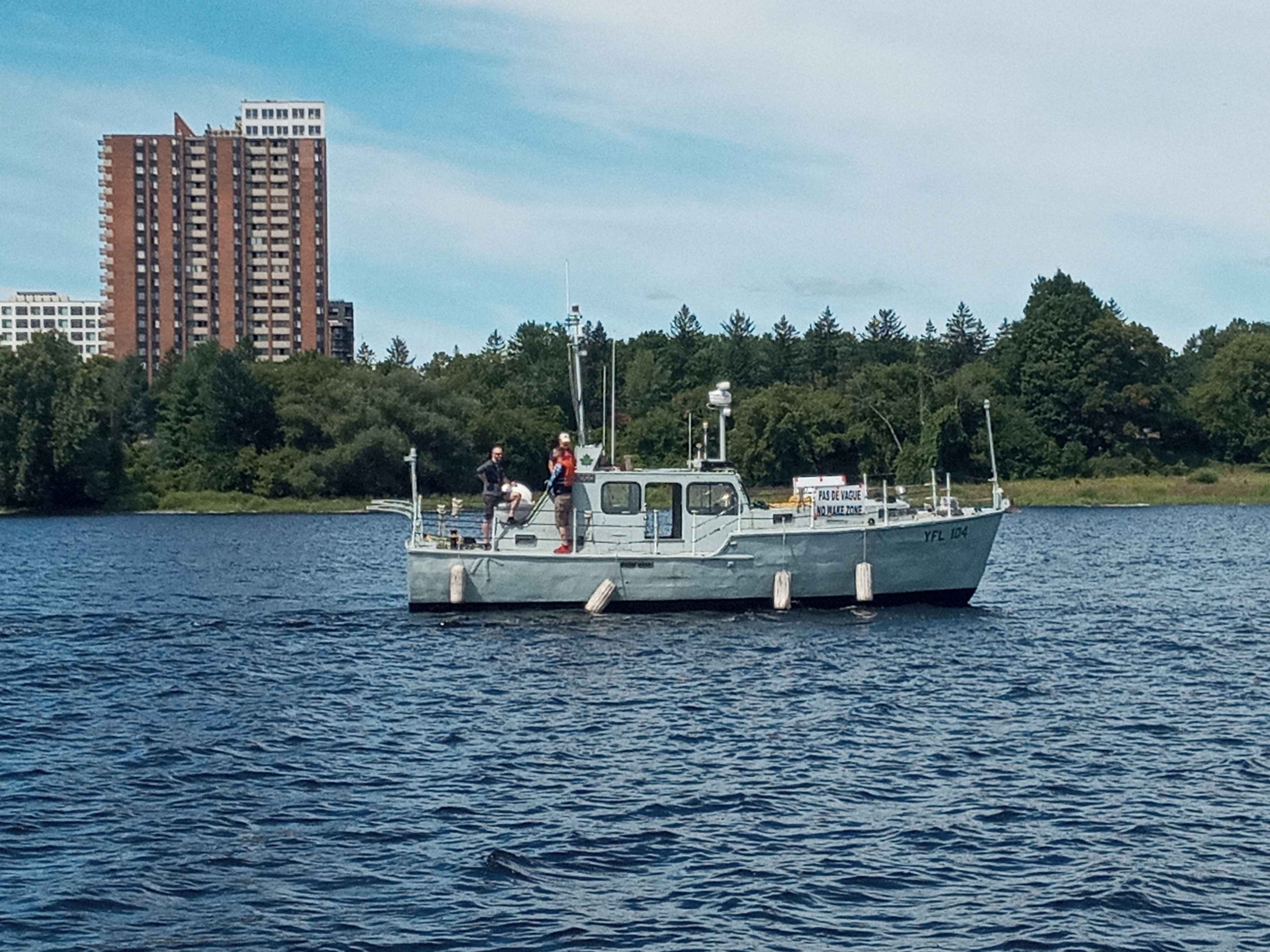
The vessel Pogo on the Ottawa River

Pogo (YFL-104), HMCS Labrador's hydrographic sounding craft was obtained by the Outaouais Branch of the Navy League of Canada from the Canadian War Museum in 2005. Pogo, a 36-foot (11 m) all-welded aluminum motor boat constructed in 1954, is used in Royal Canadian Sea Cadets Program support.

== Sources ==
- Boutiller, James A., ed. (1982). RCN in Retrospect, 1910–1968. Vancouver: University of British Columbia Press. ISBN 0-7748-0196-4.
- Macpherson, Ken & Barrie, Ron (2002). The Ships of Canada's Naval Forces 1910–2002 (Third ed.). St. Catharines, Ontario: Vanwell Publishing. ISBN 1-55125-072-1.
- Maginley, Charles D. (2003). The Canadian Coast Guard 1962–2002. St. Catharines, Ontario: Vanwell Publishing Limited. ISBN 1-55125-075-6.
- Maginley, Charles D. & Collin, Bernard (2001). The Ships of Canada's Marine Services. St. Catharines, Ontario: Vanwell Publishing Limited. ISBN 1-55125-070-5.
- Milner, Marc (2010). Canada's Navy: The First Century (Second ed.). Toronto: University of Toronto Press. ISBN 978-0-8020-9604-3.
- Moore, John, ed. (1981). Jane's Fighting Ships 1981–82. New York: Jane's Publishing Incorporated. ISBN 0-531-03977-3.
- Pigott, Peter (2011). From Far and Wide: A Complete History of Canada's Arctic Sovereignty. Toronto: Dundurn Press. ISBN 9781554889877.
