= Southeastern Shipbuilding Corporation =

- Industry: Shipbuilding
- Founded: 1942
- Defunct: August 1945
- Headquarters: Savannah, Georgia, United States
- Products: Liberty ships
- Number of employees: 46,000

The Southeastern Shipbuilding Corporation was formed in Savannah, Georgia, during World War II to build Liberty ships.

== Company history ==
Work on the shipyard was begun by Savannah Shipyards Inc. in 1940. However, dissatisfied with progress, in early 1942 the Maritime Commission revoked their contract and awarded it to the Southeastern Shipbuilding Corporation, who took over the yard. The first ship was finally launched in March 1943. The Maritime Commission was later sued by Savannah Shipyards for the "illegal seizure of their facility", and won their case, receiving substantial damages. By the end of the war, when the yard was closed, it had built 88 Liberty ships and 18 Type C1 ships.
