= Wind-class icebreaker =

Class of icebreaker ships

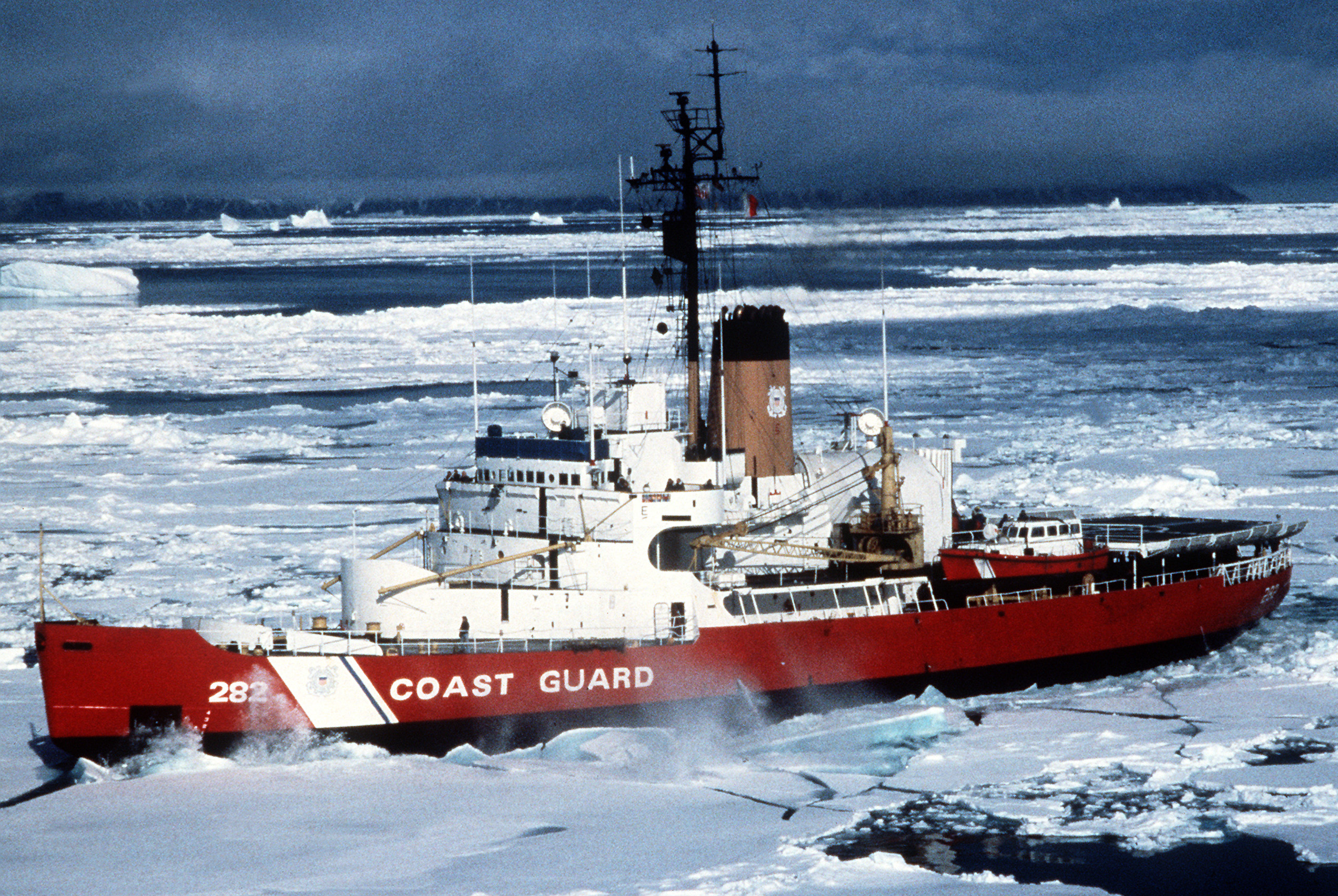
- USCGC Northwind (WAGB-282)

Class overview
- Builders: Western Pipe and Steel Company (WPS), San Pedro, California
- Operators: United States Coast Guard; United States Navy; Royal Canadian Navy; Canadian Coast Guard; Soviet Navy
- Preceded by: Apalachee class
- Succeeded by: USCGC Glacier
- Built: 1942–1946; 1949—1952 (Note: (CCGS Labrador) — built to a modified design for the Canadian Coast Guard.)
- In commission: 1944–1989
- Completed: 8
- Scrapped: 8

General characteristics
- Type: Icebreaker
- Displacement: 6,500 short tons (5,900 metric tons) (full load)
- Length: 269 ft (82 m)
- Beam: 63 ft 6 in (19.35 m)
- Draft: 25 ft 9 in (7.85 m)
- Installed power: Six Fairbanks-Morse 10-cylinder diesel engines
- Propulsion: Diesel-electric; 12,000 shp (combined)
- Speed: 13.4 knots (24.8 km/h; 15.4 mph) (maximum)
- Range: 32,485 mi (52,280 km) at 11.6 knots (21.5 km/h; 13.3 mph)
- Complement: 219 officers and men
- Armament: WAG 278 for USSR service: 4 × 3"/30; 8 × 40 mm/60; 6 × 20 mm/80; 2 × depth charge tracks; WAG 279-282: 4 × 5 in (127 mm)/38 cal deck guns; 12 ×40 mm/60 cal anti-aircraft guns; 6 × 20 mm/80 cal anti-aircraft guns; 2 × depth charge racks; Y-gun projectors; 1 × Hedgehog anti-submarine mortar; AG 88-89: 1 × 5 in (127 mm)/38 cal deck gun; 12 × 40 mm/60 cal anti-aircraft guns(AG 88 only); AW 50: None
- Aircraft carried: 1 Grumman J2F Duck seaplane (as built)
- Aviation facilities: Aft turret replaced by retractable hangar on aft helicopter deck after WW2

The Wind-class icebreakers were a line of diesel electric-powered icebreakers in service with the United States Navy, United States Coast Guard, Royal Canadian Navy, Canadian Coast Guard and Soviet Navy from 1944 through the late 1970s. They were very effective ships: all except Eastwind served at least thirty years, and Northwind served in the USCG continuously for forty-four years. Considered the most technologically advanced icebreakers in the world when first built, the Wind-class icebreakers were also heavily armed; the first operator of the class was the United States Coast Guard, which used the vessels for much-needed coastal patrol off Greenland during World War II. Three of the vessels of the class, Westwind, Southwind, and the first Northwind all went on to serve temporarily for the Soviet Union under the Lend-Lease program, while two others were built for the United States Navy and another was built for the Royal Canadian Navy; all eight vessels were eventually transferred to the United States Coast Guard and the Canadian Coast Guard.

The Wind-class ships were the first class of true icebreakers built by the United States. Gibbs & Cox of New York provided the designs with input from the Coast Guard's Naval Engineering Division. The final design was heavily influenced by studies conducted by then LCDR Edward Thiele, USCG (later RADM, and Engineer in Chief of the U.S. Coast Guard) of foreign icebreakers, namely the Swedish Ymer, built in 1931, and the Soviet Krasin.

Seven ships of the class were built in the United States, and one modified version, HMCS Labrador, was built in Canada.

== Construction ==
State of the art when designed, their hull was of unprecedented strength and structural integrity. The outer hull plating was constructed with 1-5/8 inch thick high tensile steel and they had a double bottom above the waterline with the two "skins" being approximately 15 inches apart, insulated with cork. Framing was closely spaced and the entire hull was designed for great strength. With a relatively short length in proportion to the great power developed, their bow had the characteristic sloping forefoot that enabled her to ride up on heavy ice and break it with the weight of the vessel. Their stern was similarly shaped to facilitate breaking ice while backing down. The sides of the icebreaker were rounded, with marked tumblehome, that enabled the ship to break free from ice by heeling from side to side. Such heeling was accomplished by shifting water rapidly from wing tanks on one side of the ship to the other. A total of 220 tons of water could be shifted from one side to the other in as little as 90 seconds, which induced a list of 10 degrees. Ballast could also be shifted rapidly between fore and aft tanks to change the trim of the ship. Diesel electric machinery was chosen for its controllability and resistance to damage, and they were fitted with a removable front propeller used to create a wash to clear ice.

== General characteristics ==
(as originally fitted during World War II)

- Builder: Western Pipe and Steel Company (WPS) San Pedro, California
- Power Plant: six Fairbanks Morse diesel engines at 2000 Bhp each, powering 3 electric propulsion motors. Two screws aft, one forward, (the bow screw was detachable and seldom used for propulsion; it was primarily to create a wash to clear away broken ice).
- Length: 269 ft (82 m)
- Beam: 63.5 ft (19.4 m)
- Displacement: approx. 6,515 tons full load (fl)
- Speed: 16.8 knots (31.1 km/h; 19.3 mph)
- Aircraft: 1 Grumman J2F Duck seaplane
- Cost: about US$10 million each
- Service Life: An estimated 20 years
- Crew: 21 officers, 295 enlisted as built; (after World War II, the U.S. vessels of the Wind-class had their armament gradually reduced, which also reduced their complements)
- Armament: Four 5-inch/38 (127 mm) dual purpose guns (2 twin turrets). Twelve 40 mm/60 AA guns (3 quadruple turrets). Six 20 mm/80 AA; Y-guns. Two depth charge racks. One Hedgehog launcher. M2 Browning machine guns and small arms. Due to being ordered during the war the first five U.S. built Wind-class icebreakers were heavily armed for ships of their size. Northwind/Staten Island (WAG 278) armament reduced to four single 3-inch/50 and eight single 40 mm for Soviet service. Weapons systems were gradually removed, and by 1970 all that remained were M2 Brownings, M60 machine guns, and small arms for law enforcement purposes.
- Dates Deployed:1942 to 1989

== U.S. Ship Numbers ==
Initially, the ships of the Wind-class carried the designation of either WAG for Coast Guard, Auxiliary, General, or, (the U.S. Navy) AGB for Auxiliary, General, Breaker. In 1949 all U.S. Coast Guard WAGs were redesignated WAGBs for Coast Guard, Auxiliary, General, Breaker. During 1965 and 1966, all U.S. Navy icebreakers were transferred to the U.S. Coast Guard. NB: The two Northwinds referenced below are not to be confused with one another.

- The USCGC Staten Island (WAG-278) was built as Northwind (WAG-278), commissioned as Staten Island (WAG-278) and immediately sent to the U.S.S.R. under lend-lease. Upon return she was USS Northwind (AGB-5) for less than three months, then renamed USS Staten Island (AGB-5) to avoid confusion with USCGC Northwind (WAG-282), and finally renamed USCGC Staten Island (WAGB-278).
- The USCGC Eastwind (WAG-279) was redesignated USCGC Eastwind (WAGB-279).
- The USCGC Southwind (WAG-280) on return from U.S.S.R Lend-Lease service was renamed USS Atka (AGB-3), and later renamed, USCGC Southwind (WAGB-280).
- The USCGC Westwind (WAG281) on return from U.S.S.R. Lend-Lease service was named USS Westwind (AGB-6) and later renamed USCGC Westwind (WAGB-281).
- The USCGC Northwind (WAG-282) was redesignated USCGC Northwind (WAGB-282).
- The USS Burton Island (AGB-88) was redesignated USS Burton Island (AGB-1) and then renamed USCGC Burton Island (WAGB-283).
- The USS Edisto (AGB-89) was redesignated USS Edisto (AGB-2), and finally renamed USCGC Edisto (WAGB-284).

For Canada's Wind-class icebreaker, the Royal Canadian Navy (RCN) assigned Pennant Number AW 50 to the Canadian-built HMCS Labrador. Labrador served in RCN from 1954 to 1957. Labrador was then transferred to Department of Transport (DOT), recommissioned Canadian Government Ship (CGS) Labrador serving 1958 to 1962. She was again transferred to the Canadian Coast Guard (CCG) and recommissioned CCGS Labrador, serving from 1962 to 1987. Labrador was not fitted with any weapons systems. Labrador possessed all the general characteristics of her American-built sister ships, but was much improved with state-of-the-art gear at the time (1951). Labrador was the only Canadian Wind-class icebreaker to be constructed, and also the last of the Wind-class to be built.

== Ships in class ==
USCGC Staten Island (WAGB-278)

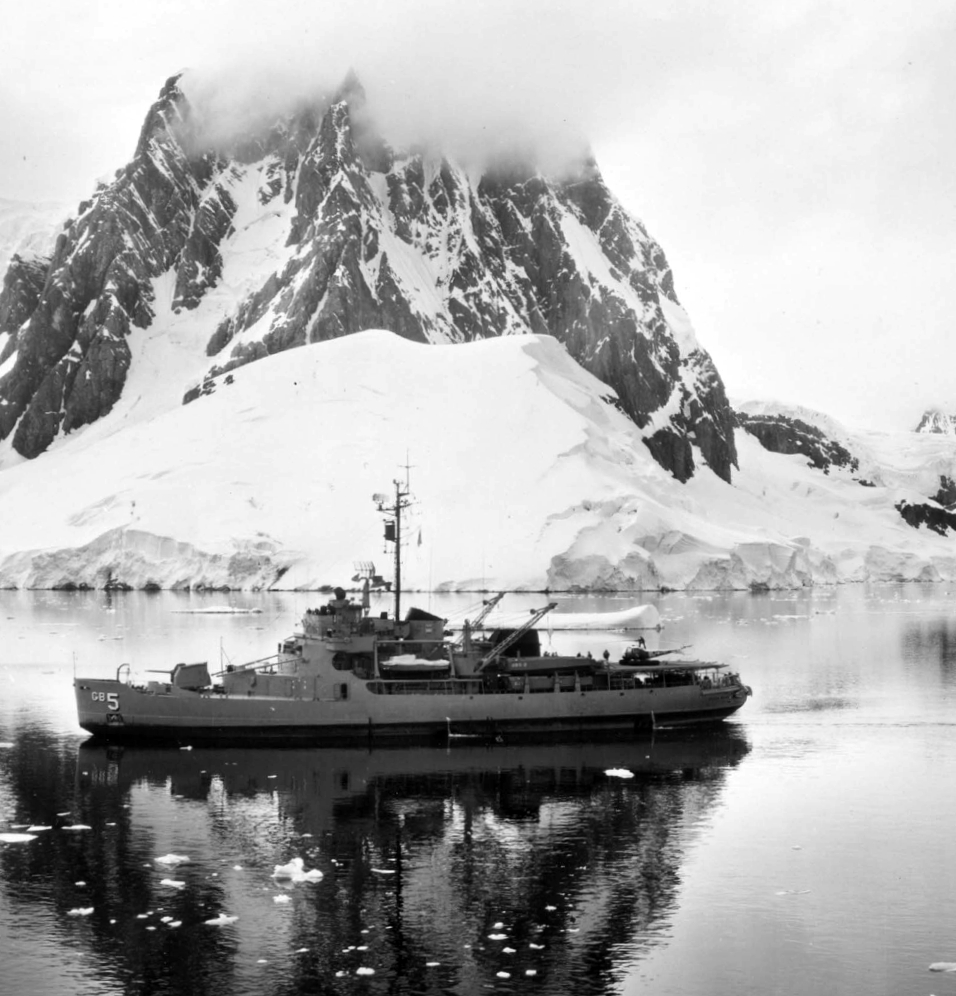
USCGC Staten Island

- Builders: United States (Western Pipe and Steel Company (WPS) in San Pedro, California).
- Laid down: 9 June 1942.
- Launched: 28 December 1942 (List).
- Operators: Soviet Navy, United States Navy, United States Coast Guard.
- Commissioned: 26 February 1944 (List).
- Status: Decommissioned 15 November 1974 and scrapped.
- Modifications:
- Operations:

Went to Soviet Navy in 1944 where she was known as Severni Veter (North wind) and since 1946 as Kapitan Belousov as part of the Lend-Lease program; returned to United States Navy in 1951 as Northwind, renamed Staten Island in 1952, then transferred to United States Coast Guard in 1966.

USCGC Eastwind (WAGB-279)

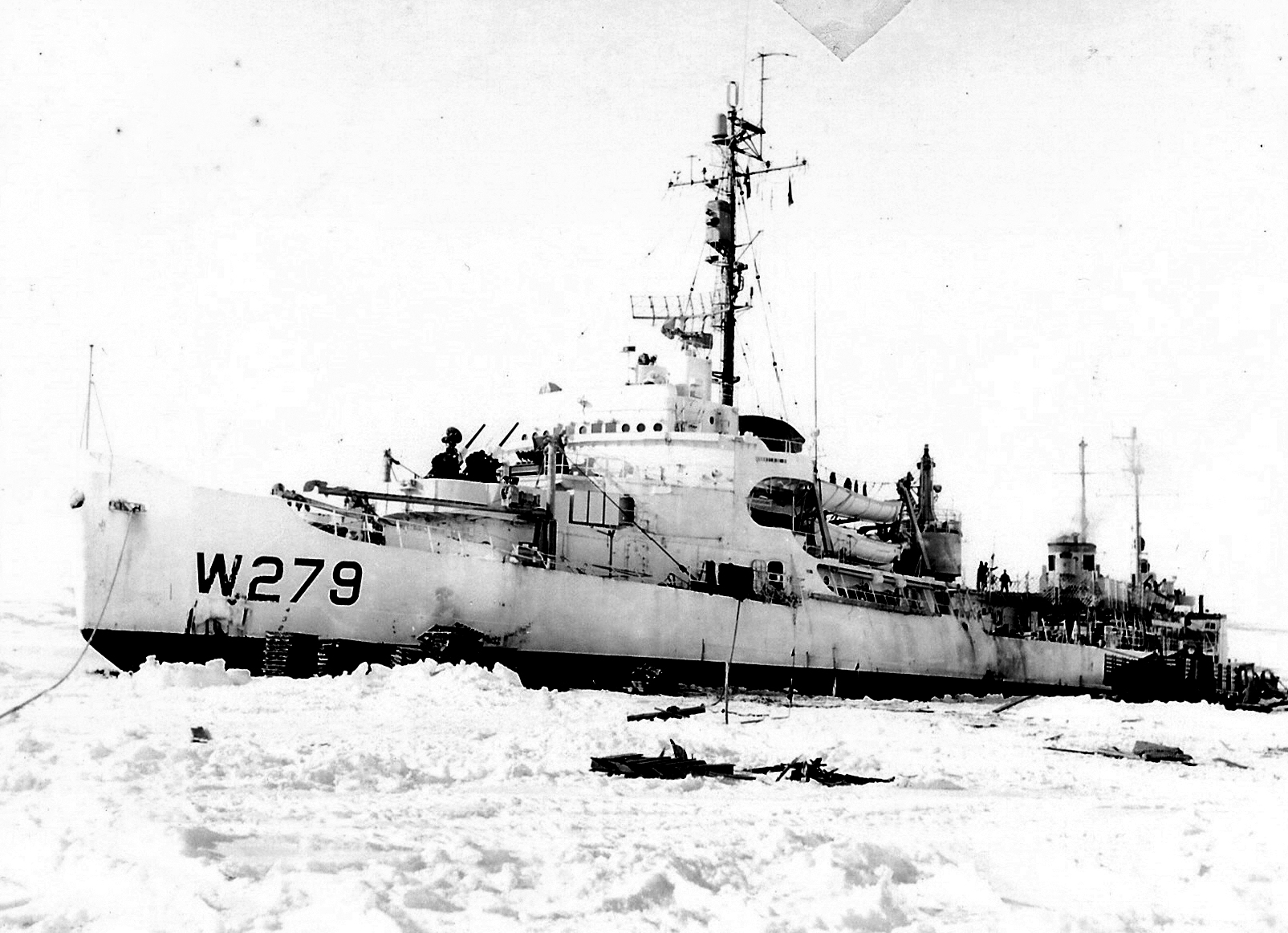
USCGC Eastwind (WAGB-279)

- Builders: United States (Western Pipe and Steel Company (WPS) in San Pedro, California).
- Laid down: 23 June 1942.
- Launched: 3 June 1944 (List).
- Operator: United States Coast Guard.
- Commissioned: 3 June 1944 (List).
- Status: Decommissioned 13 December 1968, sold in 1972 and scrapped.
- Modifications:
- Operations:

USCGC Southwind (WAGB-280)

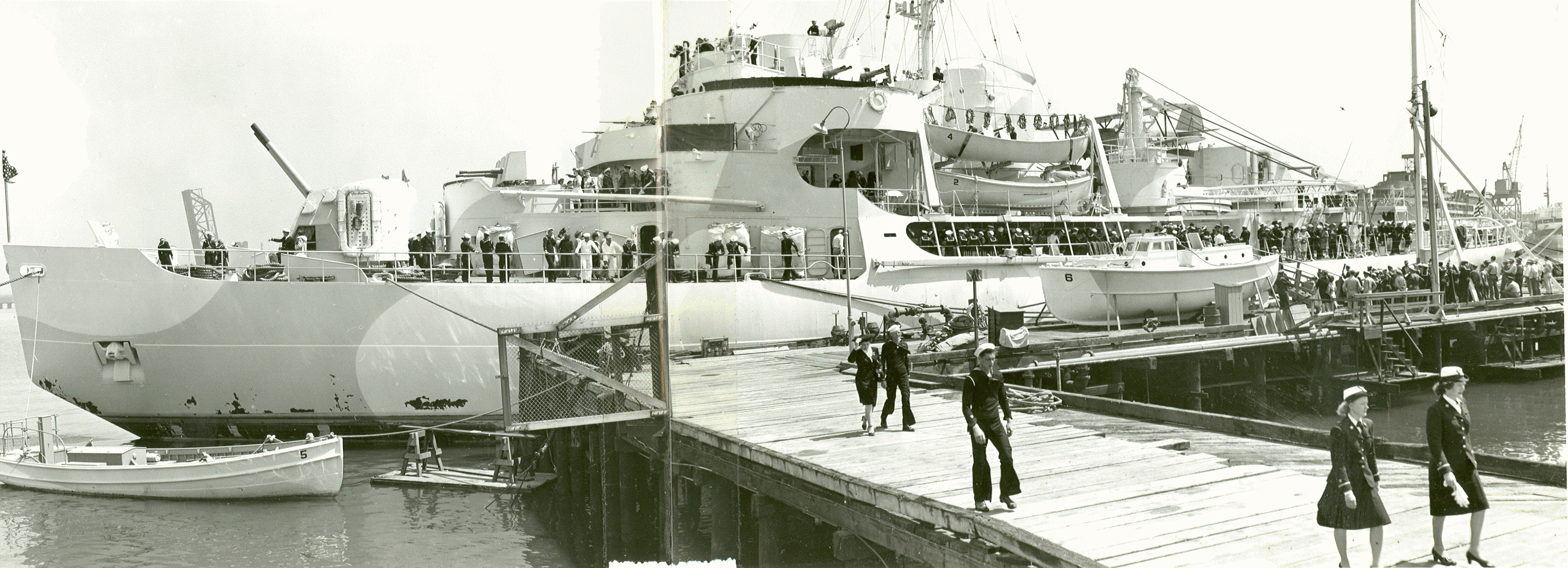
USCGC Southwind

- Builders: United States (Western Pipe and Steel Company (WPS) in San Pedro, California).
- Laid down: 20 July 1942.
- Launched: 8 March 1943 (List).
- Operator: United States Navy, Soviet Navy, United States Coast Guard.
- Commissioned: 15 July 1944 (List).
- Status: Decommissioned: 31 May 1974, sold for scrap 1976
- Modifications:
- Operations:

Sent to Soviet Navy in 1945 where she was known as Admiral Makarov as part of the Lend-Lease program. Returned to United States Navy in 1950 as the USS Atka, then transferred in 1966 to United States Coast Guard where she was known as the USCGC Southwind.

USCGC Westwind (WAGB-281)

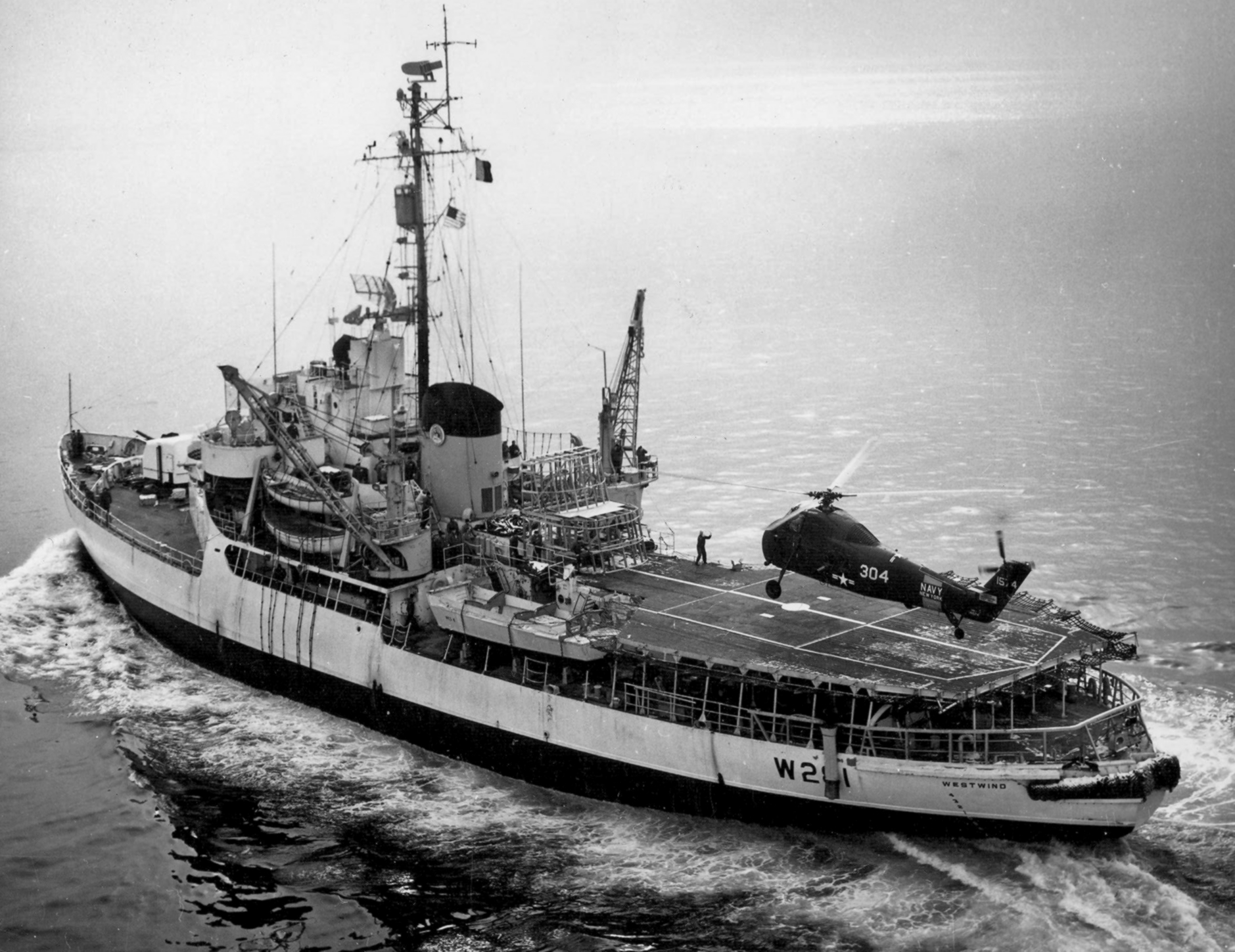
USCGC Westwind

- Builders: United States (Western Pipe and Steel Company (WPS) in San Pedro, California).
- Laid down: 24 August 1942.
- Launched: 31 March 1943.
- Operator: United States Coast Guard, Soviet Navy.
- Commissioned: 18 September 1944.
- Status: Decommissioned: 29 February 1988 sold and scrapped.
- Modifications:
- Operations:

Sent to Soviet Navy in 1945 where she was known as Severni Polius (North pole) as part of the Lend-Lease program. Returned to United States Navy in 1951, transferred to United States Coast Guard in 1952.

USCGC Northwind (WAGB-282)

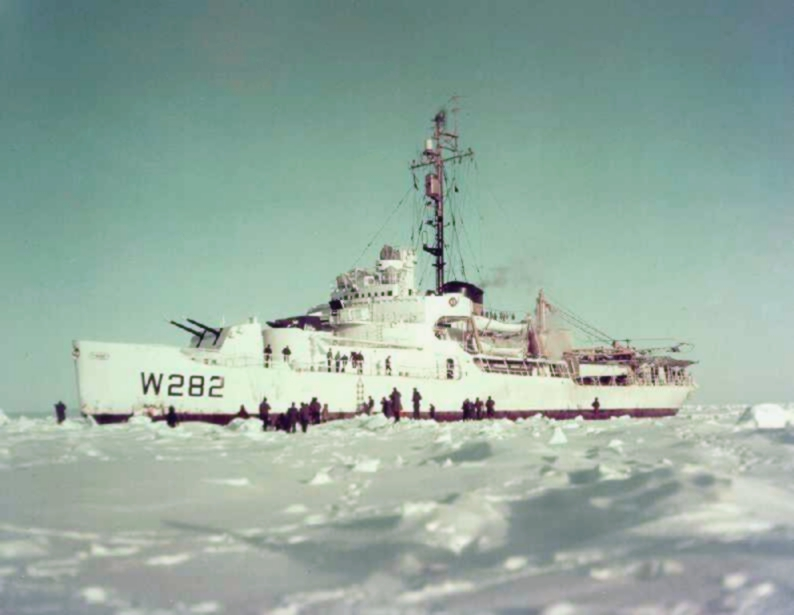
USCGC Northwind

- Builders: United States (Western Pipe and Steel Company (WPS) in San Pedro, California).
- Laid down: 20 July 1944.
- Launched: 25 February 1945 (List).
- Operator: United States Coast Guard.
- Commissioned: 28 July 1945 (List).
- Status: Decommissioned 20 January 1989 and scrapped.
- Modifications:
- Operations:

This was the second icebreaker commissioned Northwind. The first Northwind was transferred to the USSR under Lend-Lease and became Staten Island upon her return to the United States. The name change was made to avoid confusion with the other icebreaker.

USCGC Burton Island (WAGB-283)

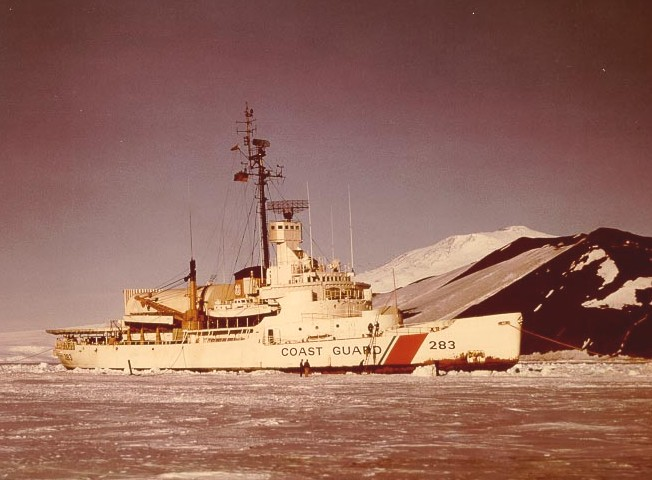
USCGC Burton Island (WAGB-283)

- Builders: United States (Western Pipe and Steel Company (WPS) in San Pedro, California).
- Laid down: 15 March 1946.
- Launched: 30 April 1946 (List).
- Operator: United States Navy, United States Coast Guard.
- Commissioned: 28 December 1946
- Status: Decommissioned 9 May 1978, sold 1980, and scrapped 1982.
- Modifications:
- Operations:

USCGC Edisto (WAGB-284)

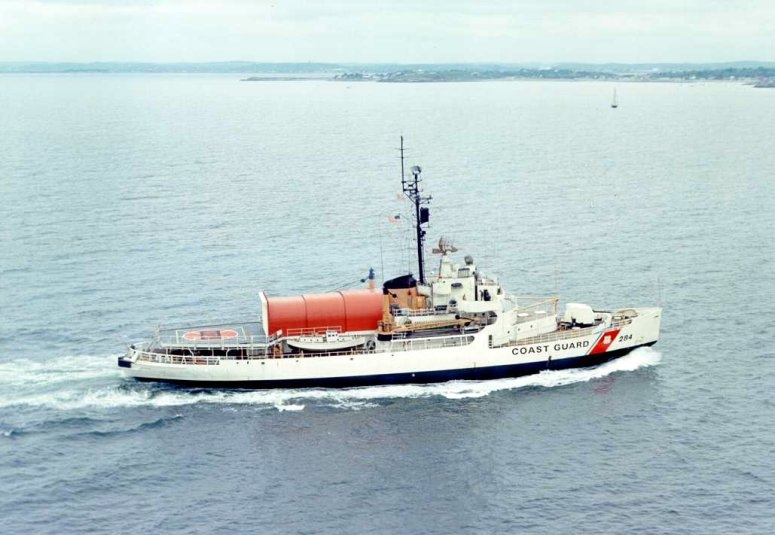
USCGC Edisto (WAGB-284)

- Builders: United States (Western Pipe and Steel Company (WPS) in San Pedro, California).
- Laid down: 15 May 1945.
- Launched: 29 May 1946 (List).
- Operator: United States Navy, United States Coast Guard.
- Commissioned: 29 March 1946 (List).
- Status: Decommissioned 15 Nov 1977 and scrapped.
- Modifications:
- Operations:

CCGS Labrador

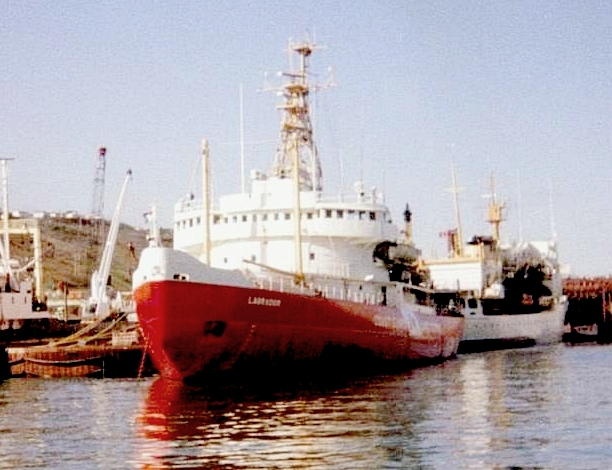
CCGS Labrador

- Builders: Canada (Marine Industries in Sorel, Quebec).
- Laid down: 18 November 1949
- Launched: 14 December 1951
- Operators: Royal Canadian Navy, Canada Department of Transport, Canadian Coast Guard.
- Commissioned: 8 July 1954 (List).
- Aircraft carried: RCN Bell 47 helicopter
- Status: Decommissioned 1987 and scrapped.
- Modifications:
- Operations:

== Similar Vessels ==
- USCGC Mackinaw (WAGB-83) - Great Lakes icebreaker based on the Wind-class design.
- USCGC Glacier (WAGB-4). Glacier-class icebreaker.
