= Edward Thiele =

Edward Thiele was a rear admiral in the United States Coast Guard.

== Biography ==
Thiele was born on September 4, 1905, in Washington, D.C. He graduated from McKinley Technology High School. Thiele died in 1981.

== Career ==
Thiele was originally a member of the District of Columbia National Guard, serving with the 121st Engineer Battalion. He was honorably discharged in 1924 and entered the United States Coast Guard Academy, graduating in 1927.

Afterwards, he was assigned to the USS Cummings (DD-44), the USS Shaw (DD-68) and the USCGC Mendota (WHEC-69). From 1930 to 1933, Thiele was an instructor at the School of Instruction. Additionally, he was coach of the swimming team. Later, he served aboard the USS Hunt (DD-194).

During World War II, Thiele helped design the Wind-class icebreakers and the USCGC Mackinaw (WAGB-83). He then served as the first executive officer of the USCGC Westwind (WAGB-281), one of the ships he helped to design. Later, he commanded the USS General D. E. Aultman (AP-156) and the USS Wakefield (AP-21) in the Pacific Theater of Operations. Awards Thiele received for his service in the war include the American Defense Service Medal, the World War II Victory Medal, the Navy Occupation Service Medal and the Philippine Defense Medal.

Thiele's later assignment included serving in London, England and as Engineer-in-Chief of the Coast Guard. He retired from the Coast Guard in 1961.
