= USCGC Edisto =

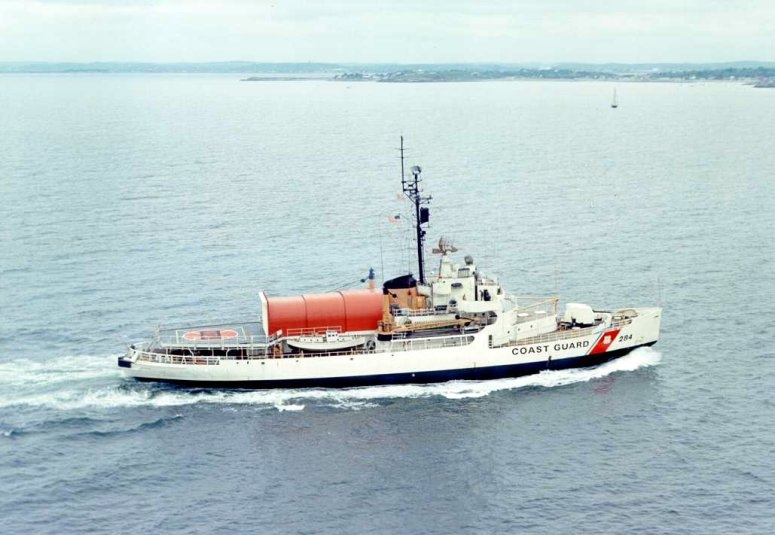
- USCGC Edisto (WAGB-284) underway

History

United States
- Name: USS Edisto
- Namesake: Edisto Island, South Carolina
- Builder: Western Pipe & Steel (WPS), San Pedro, California, U.S.
- Laid down: 1946 WPS yard, San Pedro, California, U.S.
- Launched: 29 May 1946
- Sponsored by: Mrs. George B Gelly
- Commissioned: 20 March 1947
- Decommissioned: 20 October 1965
- Maiden voyage: 11 April 1947
- Out of service: 20 October 1965
- Reclassified: AGB-2 on 29 January 1949
- Home port: Boston, Massachusetts, U.S.
- Identification: AGB-2
- Nickname(s): "Ready Eddie"
- Fate: Transferred to U.S. Coast Guard on 20 October 1965

United States
- Name: USCGC Edisto
- Namesake: Edisto Island, South Carolina
- Acquired: 20 October 1965
- Commissioned: 20 October 1965
- Decommissioned: 15 November 1974
- Refit: 1963-1964 at Boston Naval Shipyard
- Home port: Boston, Massachusetts, U.S; Baltimore, Maryland, U.S.
- Identification: WAGB-284; Call sign: NLKY
- Nickname(s): "Lucky Eddie"; "Unlucky"; "Ready Eddie"; "Guardian of the Redwood Coast"; "Red Microphone of Death"
- Fate: Transferred to US General Services Administration (GSA), sold 29 September 1977 to Boston Metals Company of Baltimore Maryland who sold her to Union Minerals Company of Carey New Jersey in 1980. Broken up at Baltimore Shipyards.

General characteristics
- Class & type: Wind-class icebreaker
- Tonnage: 5,957 (1966)
- Displacement: 5,957 tons. (1966)
- Length: 269 ft (82.0 m)
- Beam: 63 ft 6 in (19.4 m)
- Draft: 28 ft 4 in (8.6 m) max
- Installed power: Diesel-electric: 6 × Fairbanks-Morse model 8-1/8OP, 10-cylinder opposed piston engines at 2,000 shp (1,500 kW), each driving a Westinghouse DC electric generator. (1944)
- Propulsion: 2 × Westinghouse Electric DC electric motors driving the 2 aft propellers, 1 × 3,000 shp (2,200 kW) Westinghouse DC electric motor driving the detachable and seldom used bow propeller.
- Speed: 13 knots (24 km/h; 15 mph)
- Range: 27,000 nmi (50,000 km; 31,000 mi) at 10 knots (19 km/h; 12 mph)
- Boats & landing craft carried: 4 lifeboats, 1 LCVP, 1 Greenland Cruiser, replaced later with 1 Arctic Survey Boat (1946).
- Complement: 14 officers, 2 warrants officers, 189 enlisted (1966).
- Crew: On polar operations, the crew includes a group of SCUBA divers, a medical officer, four pilots, twelve aviation ratings, and various scientists and observers, bringing the total force to about 225.
- Sensors & processing systems: Radar: SPS-10B; SPS-6C; SPA-4; SPA-8A (1966). Other: LORAN, radioteletype (RTTY), facsimile, all-mode MF, HF, VHF, and UHF radios, radio direction finder, sonic sounding machine, handy-talkies, radio-telephone, and an amateur radio station.
- Armament: 1 × 5 in (130 mm)/38 caliber gun; 1 × Mk 52 Mod 3 fire control radar; M2 Browning machine guns; M60 machine guns
- Aircraft carried: 2 helicopters
- Aviation facilities: Helicopter flight deck with retractable hangar.
- Notes: Equipped with laboratories and facilities for conducting oceanographic studies, hydrographic surveys, and high altitude meteorological observations by radiosonde.

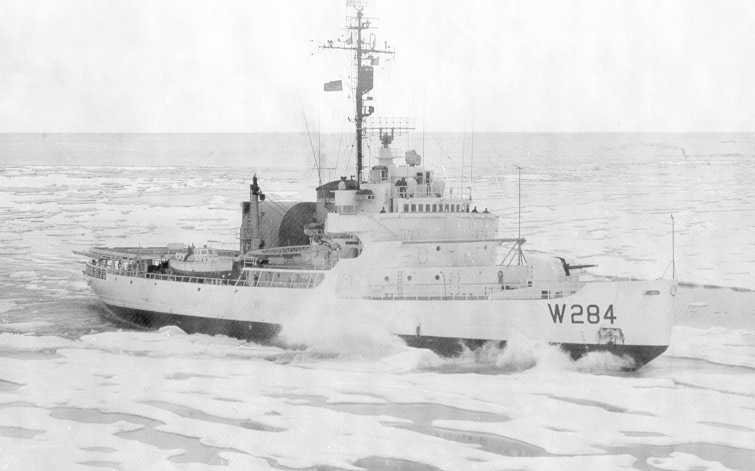
USCGC Edisto. Note retracted hangar.

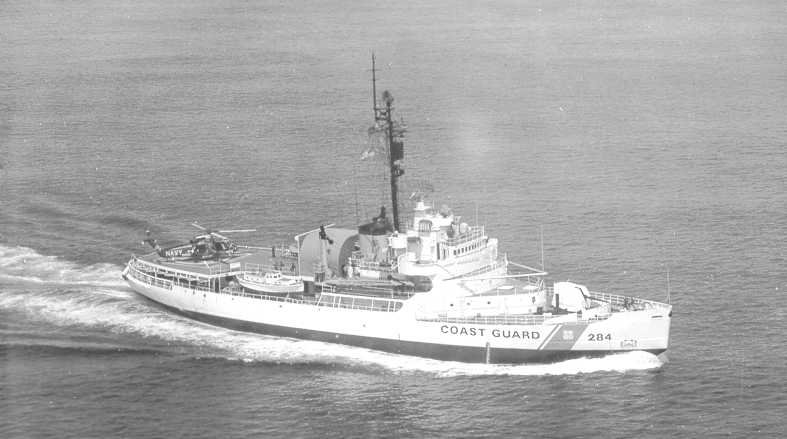
USCGC Edisto. Note the hangar is retracted while a helicopter rests on the hangar deck.

USS Edisto (AGB-2) was a Wind-class icebreaker in the service of the United States Navy and was later transferred to the United States Coast Guard as USCGC Edisto (WAGB-284). She was named after Edisto Island, South Carolina. The island is named after the Native American Edisto Band who inhabited the island and the surrounding area. As of 2011 there is a namesake cutter USCGC Edisto (WPB-1313). The newer Edisto is a 110-foot Island-class patrol boat and is stationed in San Diego County, California.

== History ==
=== Construction ===
Edisto was one of the icebreakers designed by Lieutenant Commander Edward Thiele and Gibbs & Cox of New York, who modeled them after plans for European icebreakers he obtained before the start of World War II. She was the last of seven completed ships of the Wind class of icebreakers operated by the United States Coast Guard. Her keel was laid on May 15, 1945 at Western Pipe and Steel Company shipyards in San Pedro, California, she was launched on December 28, 1946, and commissioned on March 20, 1947.

Her outer hull plating was constructed with 1 5/8-inch (41 mm)-thick high tensile steel. Edisto had a double bottom above the waterline with the two "skins" being approximately 15 in (380 mm) apart, insulated with cork. Framing was closely spaced and the entire hull girder was designed for great strength. Edisto's bow had the characteristic sloping forefoot that enabled her to ride up on heavy ice and break it with the weight of the vessel. Edisto's stern was similarly shaped to facilitate breaking ice while backing down. The sides of the icebreaker were rounded, with marked tumble home, that enabled the ship to break free from ice by heeling from side to side. Such heeling was accomplished by shifting water rapidly from wing tanks on one side of the ship to the other. A total of 220 tons of water could be shifted from one side to the other in as little as 90 seconds, which induced a list of 10 degrees. Ballast could also be shifted rapidly between fore and aft tanks to change the trim of the ship. Diesel electric machinery was chosen for its controllability and resistance to damage.

Edisto was built during peacetime, so she had a much lighter armament than her war-built sisters, one 5 in (127 mm) 38 caliber deck gun when in Navy service, and unarmed for the Coast Guard.

=== U.S. Navy service ===
On April 11, 1947, Edisto sailed for the United States East Coast on a shake-down cruise. That summer, during a training cruise to Greenland, she crossed the Arctic Circle for the first of many times in her career. Upon her return to Boston, Massachusetts, Edisto was assigned to Task Force 39 for the Second Antarctic Development Project. She sailed on November 1, 1947 for a rendezvous via the Panama Canal with USS Burton Island at American Samoa. Together, they ventured south, becoming the first ships to penetrate the pack ice east of the Ross Sea. While in the Antarctic on this deployment, Edisto trained sailors and tested cold weather equipment, as well as investigating installations and equipment left by Operation Highjump of the previous year. She also collected valuable scientific data concerning geographic, hydrographic, photographic, oceanographic, meteorological, and electromagnetic conditions in the south polar regions.

Upon her return to Boston, Massachusetts on March 31, 1948, Edisto immediately began preparing for operations in the far north. During this summer deployment, her task force resupplied weather stations at Thule, Greenland, and on Ellesmere and Ellif Renghes Islands. The ships in this task force did reconnaissance to establish additional weather stations, trained men in cold weather operations, tested equipment, and collected a variety of data. Except for brief repairs in Boston for replacement of a broken propeller shaft, Edisto continued this grueling grind until September 25, 1948. During December 1948, in company with USS Hoist, she successfully rescued USS Whitewood, which had been damaged by ice and had run aground in Tunulliarfik Fjord at Narsaq, Greenland.

The next cruise of Edisto to the north polar regions was for purely exploratory purposes. Not even waiting for summer, she sailed out of Boston Harbor on January 24, 1949 to determine how much an icebreaker would be limited by the foul Arctic storms and lowest temperatures. She weathered extreme sub-zero conditions and returned to Boston on March 25, 1949.

From 1949 until her transfer to the U.S. Coast Guard on October 20, 1965, Edisto continued her support to exploration in both Arctic and Antarctic regions. The icebreaker supplied bases, reported ice packs and floes, took part in oceanographic, hydrographic, geological, coast and geodetic, and hydrophone surveys, and participated in Arctic convoy exercises. In 1949, Edisto took part in Operation Bluejay, the construction of radar stations in the far north. The following year, on August 6, 1950, Edisto set a record for northernmost penetration by reaching latitude 82 degrees North while conducting oceanographic surveys. In 1952, the work she had begun in Operation Bluejay was completed.

While participating in Operation Deep Freeze I during the winter (Antarctic summer) of 1955–1956, Edisto penetrated unexplored areas in the Antarctic near Cape Hallett, leaving "Edisto Bay" and "Edisto Acres" penguin rookery named in her honor. After her return to Boston the ship was again assigned to Arctic missions, aiding shipping in the Newfoundland and Labrador area for the remainder of 1956 and all of 1957. In December 1958, Edisto departed for Operation Deep Freeze IV. Her work in the Antarctic this time was in support of the International Geophysical Year. From April 16–26, 1959, while en route home, she stopped in Montevideo, Uruguay, which was experiencing disastrous floods. The crew labored many long hours in flood relief work, rescuing 227 persons by helicopter, thereby receiving the personal thanks of the president of Uruguay on their departure.

Her next Antarctic trip came during the winter (Antarctic summer) of 1960-1961 as a member of Operation Deep Freeze 61. While operating far south of New Zealand in an attempt to salvage a naval vessel that had broken loose from its moorings, Edisto encountered what was probably the worst storm of her career. With tons of ice loading her topside down, she staggered to regain stability at the end of each long, agonizing roll. Before the storm had blown itself out, Edisto had lost most of her rigging and her starboard propeller.

As a unit of the task force for Operation Deep Freeze 63 in 1962–1963, she spent 131 consecutive days in the ice. During this time, her crew witnessed the breakup of Rear Admiral Richard Evelyn Byrd's Little America III, built in 1940 and 1941. Instead of going south for the 1963–1964 season in the Antarctic, Edisto entered the Boston Naval Shipyard. Then, on June 15, 1963, she departed Boston for military resupply operations in the Arctic. While on this cruise, Edisto used Prince Christian Sound instead of rounding Cape Farewell, Greenland probably making her the first US naval vessel to transit this sound since USCGC Northland in 1941. Before returning to Boston in early October 1964, she picked up ten Navy scientists in Iceland and proceeded to the waters between Greenland and Spitsbergen, Norway to carry out an oceanographic survey between June 25 and August 26.

On December 10, 1964, Edisto departed for the Antarctic as a unit of the task force for Operation Deep Freeze 65 on an assignment unprecedented in icebreaker history. She had the responsibility for constructing the new Palmer Station for marine biological studies on Anvers Island off the Antarctic Peninsula. No sooner had she accomplished this assignment and returned to Boston, than Edisto was ordered to sail on a polar rescue mission. Drifting south was the Ice Island Arlis II, with 20 scientists on board waiting to be evacuated before the island broke up underneath them. Departing Boston on April 6, 1965, after a stay of only five days, she battled some of the thickest and hardest ice ever encountered by an American icebreaker to moor alongside Ice Island Arlis II and to effect the evacuation of the men and equipment.

During the summer of 1965, Edisto again sailed to the Arctic in support of the northern defense outposts and for oceanographic survey work. Before her return to Boston in early October 1965, a message informed her that she would be the first of the United States Navy icebreakers turned over to the United States Coast Guard under the transfer agreement signed between the United States Department of the Treasury and United States Department of the Navy. As Edisto sailed south, U.S. Coast Guard officers boarded who would command the vessel following the turnover.

=== U.S. Coast Guard service ===
On October 20, 1965, Edisto was transferred to the U.S. Coast Guard and re-designated as USCGC Edisto (WAGB-284). The icebreaker was decommissioned by the U.S. Navy, transferred, and immediately commissioned by the Coast Guard at Constitution Wharf, U.S. Coast Guard Base in Boston, Massachusetts. The Coast Guard changed Edisto's hull number to WAGB-284.

Her first mission as a Coast Guard icebreaker came the following month, when a vital undersea defense cable broke near Thule, Greenland. Although she got underway on short notice and steamed far north to join the other Canadian and American icebreakers in the repair operation, Edisto arrived only to learn that the cable had already been repaired.

After her return in early December 1965, Edisto spent the entire winter in the Bethlehem Steel Shipyard, where she underwent major repairs and alterations. Part of the alterations consisted of installations of a new flight deck with a telescopic hangar to house two helicopters which she would carry. The summer of 1966 saw Edisto deployed to the Arctic waters off Greenland and Iceland to participate in "Arctic East Summer" (AES) operations, which entailed the annual resupply of American bases in the Arctic and the advancement of polar sciences. As in the previous winter, Edisto was ordered on an unusual winter penetration into northern Baffin Bay.

The vital undersea cable connecting the remote North American defense outposts with the mainland of the United States had broken again. Reaching the break area on December 12, 1966, the icebreaker braved extreme cold, continual darkness, gale winds, and heavy icing until the break was located and repaired. For their "extremely meritorious service in support of Coast Guard operations" during this emergency, Edisto and her crew were awarded the U.S. Coast Guard Unit Commendation for the period of December 2–22, 1966.

In 1967, while in company with USCGC Eastwind, Edisto made an unsuccessful attempt to circumnavigate the Arctic, a feat that would have rivaled the 16th century voyages around the world of Magellan and Drake and has yet to be accomplished by surface vessels of any nation. In 1968 and 1969, Edisto participated in Antarctic polar deployments in support of operations Deep Freeze 69 and Deep Freeze 70.

In 1971, as in every summer since she became a U.S. Coast Guard icebreaker, Edisto took part in "Arctic East Summer" (AES) operations. From December 1971 to December 1972, she was homeported in Milwaukee, Wisconsin to take part in a test, along with USCGC Mackinaw, of icebreaking operations designed to extend the length of the shipping season on the Great Lakes and the Saint Lawrence Seaway system. In the autumn of 1972, however, Edisto conducted icebreaking operations off Greenland in concert with the U.S. Navy oceanographic research ship USNS Mizar. She was sent there from the Great Lakes after the cutter originally assigned the duty, USCGC Southwind, suffered an engine casualty; although she remained off Greenland. Edisto arrived in the Arctic on September 30, 1972 and began escorting Mizar into the icepack for oceanographic research. At one point, the two were as far as 40 miles (64 km) into the heavy ice, some of which was a thick as 6 feet (1.8 m). In early October 1972, one of the Mizar's engines went out, so Edisto took her in tow, intending to take the research vessel out of the ice. On October 6, 1972, Mizar slipped out of its tow with Edisto and collided with the icebreaker, doing minor damage to Edisto's starboard side superstructure. Later, Edisto, due to the heavy ice; lost her starboard propeller and damaged her rudder and starboard shaft.

Although Mizar repaired her engine, the ship could not break ice, so the need for a fully operational icebreaker still existed. U.S. Coast Guard officials, through the U.S. State Department, arranged for the support of Canada's 315-foot (96 m) icebreaker CCGS John A. Macdonald, in case Southwind was unable to free Mizar. John A. Macdonald sailed from Baffin Bay around the southern tip of Greenland and berthed at Reykjavík, Iceland and awaited the call for assistance.

Fortunately, Edisto managed to work her way through the open leads in the ice while Southwind, with only four of her six engines running was able to reach Mizar, still icebound where it had struck Edisto, and freed her. Southwind then took Edisto in tow, and made for Reykjavík. They arrived on October 23, 1972 and Edisto's crew made temporary repairs to her rudder for the long tow back to the U.S. They departed and headed for the U.S., but the repairs did not hold and they once again returned to Iceland. On November 2, 1972 they once again set sail.

U.S. Coast Guard Headquarters decided that Southwind would take Edisto's place on the Great Lakes for that season. They were under pressure to get a second icebreaker there before the Welland Canal closed on December 15, 1972. To lessen the impact on the crews, headquarters also determined that the ships would simply exchange their entire crews. Southwind's crew would take over during the repairs on Edisto while Edisto's crew would join Southwind once she made her new home port of Milwaukee, Wisconsin in preparation for the 1972-1973 winter season.

On November 10, 1972 USCGC Morgenthau rendezvoused with the icebreakers and prepared to take over the tow but severe weather prevented a switch. By November 13, 1972, however, the weather moderated and she took over towing, and set course for Baltimore, Maryland. Southwind then made her way to the Great Lakes. On November 24, 1972 she rendezvoused with USCGC Chilula approximately 35 miles (56 km) west of the Nantucket Lightship after first dodging a storm by sailing towards Nova Scotia. Chilula took over the towing and headed to Hampton Roads, Virginia and then to the Coast Guard Yard, where the two cutters arrived safely on November 30, 1972.

After repairs were finished she was homeported in Baltimore, Maryland and used for icebreaking. Edisto's final cruise was a three-phase "Arctic East Summer" (AES) voyage that commenced at Baltimore on July 7, 1974. She first sailed in support of the International Ice Patrol, studying some 35 icebergs of varying sizes and shapes off the west coast of Greenland and the east coast of Baffin Island, Canada. Her crew took aerial, surface, and sonar measurements of bergs to be used by marine scientists to determine their rates of deterioration and drift. As tribute to their wives, some of the crew named the icebergs under study after their loved ones. During the voyage north, Edisto assisted USNS Private John R. Towle, a cargo ship that sustained ice damage to her hull off Hamilton Inlet, Labrador.

Edisto then sailed for Edinburgh, Scotland, arriving August 12, 1974. She departed Edinburgh on August 17, 1974 and headed for the Icelandic Sea for the second phase of her cruise, where she worked in conjunction with the Icelandic government. Her crew took 40 "Nansen Casts" in the Icelandic Sea and then, on September 2, 1974, made Reykjavík. Edisto departed Reykjavík on September 5, 1974 and sailed for the Labrador Sea for the third phase of her cruise. Arriving off Cape Farewell, Greenland on September 8, 1974, her crew took 52 "STD Casts" in the Labrador Sea and along the coast of Labrador, Canada. On September 14, 1974 she finished the third phase and began her return journey to Baltimore, arriving there on September 24, 1974.

She was decommissioned at Baltimore, Maryland on November 14, 1974 and then transferred to the U.S. General Services Administration (GSA). GSA sold Edisto on September 29, 1977 to Boston Metals Company of Baltimore, Maryland who then sold her for scrap metal to the Union Minerals Company of Carey, New Jersey.

== Awards and decorations ==
- Coast Guard Unit Commendation
- National Defense Service Medal with star
- Antarctic Service Medal
