= RFA Wave Baron =

Wave-class oiler of the Royal Fleet Auxiliary

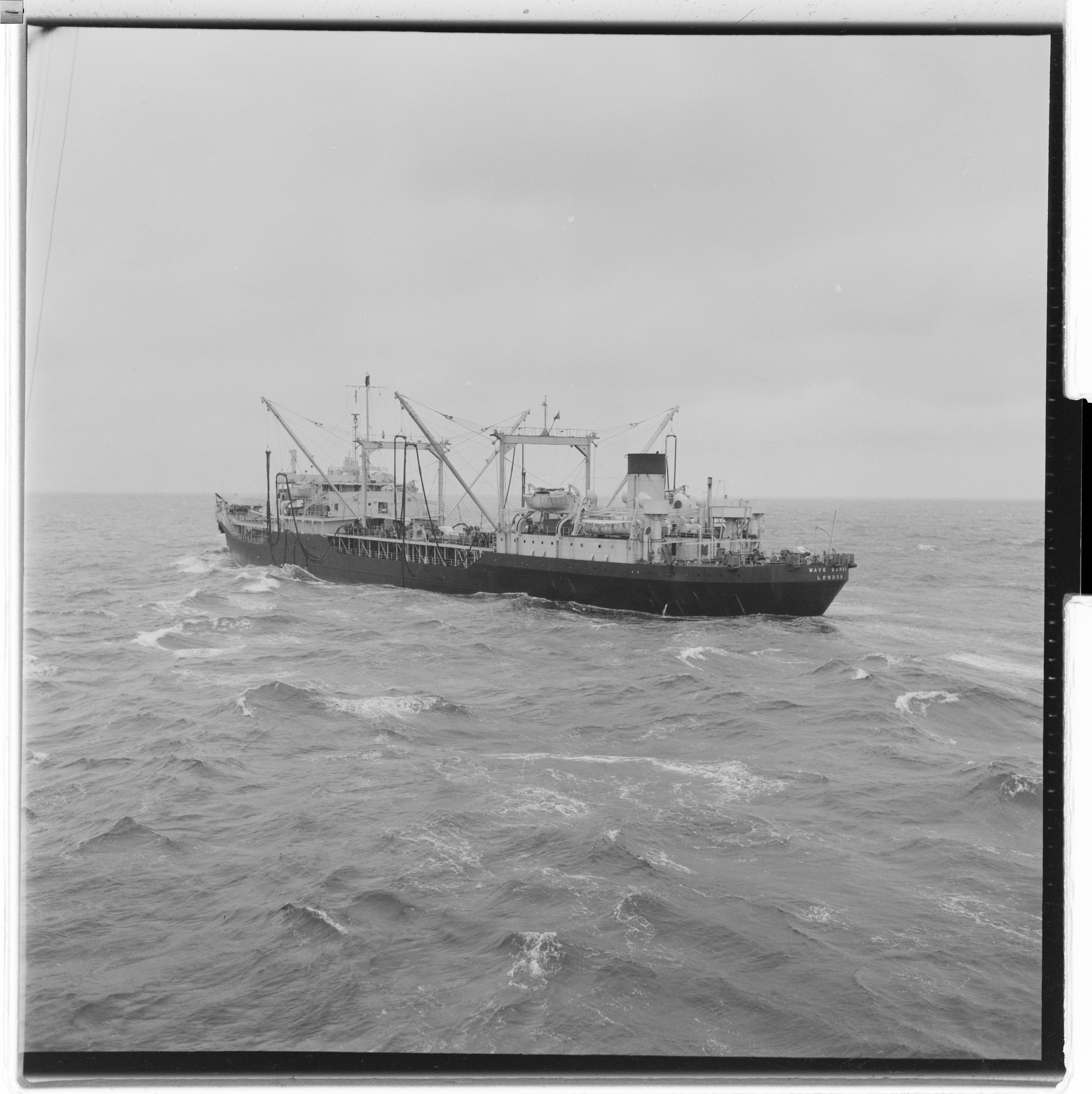
- Wave Baron in 1953

History
- Name: Empire Flodden (1946–48); Wave Baron (1948–72)
- Owner: Ministry of War Transport (1946); Admiralty (1946–72)
- Operator: Gow, Harrison & Co. Ltd (1946–48); Royal Fleet Auxiliary (1948–69)
- Port of registry: Middlesbrough, United Kingdom (1946); London, United Kingdom (1946–48); Royal Navy (1948–72)
- Builder: Furness Shipbuilding Co Ltd
- Yard number: 378
- Laid down: 1 September 1944
- Launched: 19 February 1946
- Maiden voyage: 10 July 1946
- In service: 1 April 1946
- Out of service: December 1969.
- Identification: United Kingdom Official Number 180885; Code Letters GKRV; Pennant Number X137 (1948– ); Pennant Number A242 ( –1972)
- Honours and awards: Korea 1952
- Fate: Scrapped

General characteristics
- Class & type: Wave-class oiler
- Tonnage: 8,159 GRT; 4,559 NRT; 11,900 DWT
- Displacement: 16,483 tons full displacement
- Length: 473 ft 6 in (144.32 m)
- Beam: 64 ft 3 in (19.58 m)
- Depth: 35 ft 4 in (10.77 m)
- Installed power: 2 steam turbines, 6,800 shp
- Propulsion: Single screw propeller
- Speed: 15 knots (28 km/h)

Wave Baron was a 8,159 GRT Wave-class oiler that was built in 1946 as Empire Flodden by Furness Shipbuilding Co Ltd, Haverton Hill-on-Tees, County Durham, United Kingdom for the Ministry of War Transport (MoWT). She was transferred to the Royal Fleet Auxiliary and renamed Wave Baron. She was withdrawn from service in 1969 and scrapped in 1972.

== Description ==
The ship was 473 ft 6 in (144.32 m) long overall with a beam of 64 feet 4 inches (19.61 m). She had a depth of 35 feet 4 inches (10.77 m). She was assessed at 8,129 GRT, 4,559 NRT, 11,900 DWT. Her full displacement was 16,483 tons.

The ship was propelled by two steam turbines, double reduction geared, driving a single screw propeller. The turbines were made by Richardsons, Westgarth & Co Ltd, Hartlepool, County Durham. They were rated at 6,800shp. They could propel her at 15 knots (28 km/h). Steam was supplied by three drum boilers.

== History ==
The ship was built in 1946 by Furness Shipbuilding Co Ltd, Haverton Hill-on-Tees, County Durham, United Kingdom. Laid down on 1 September 1944, she was yard number 378. She was launched on 19 February 1946 as Empire Flodden. Her port of registry was Middlesbrough, Yorkshire. The Code Letters GKRV were allocated. Empire Flodden was initially operated under the management of Gow, Harrison & Co. Ltd., Glasgow, Renfrewshire. Ownership was transferred to the Admiralty and her port of registry was changed to London.

Empire Flodden sailed from the River Tees on her maiden voyage on 10 July 1946. She operated in the Middle East, calling at Abadan, Iran, Aden and Port Said, Egypt over the next 21 months. On 1 April 1948, she was transferred to the Royal Fleet Auxiliary and renamed Wave Baron. The Pennant number X137 was allocated. This would later be changed to A242. Wave Baron was made a voyage to Trinidad in August 1948, following which she returned to the Middle East.

On 16 July 1950, a crewman was severely scalded on board Wave Baron when a pipe burst when the ship was in the Irish Sea off the Isle of Man. The Peel Lifeboat attended and he was taken to Peel and thence to Noble's Hospital, Douglas, Isle of Man for treatment. In January 1951, RMS Orion was unable to call at the Cocos Islands to collect mail. Wave Baron performed the task, taking the mail to Colombo, Ceylon for onward transmission. In November 1951, she replenished HMS Illustrious in the Mediterranean Sea. The task took eight hours.

In 1952, Wave Baron was awarded the battle honour "Korea 1952". In May 1953, she took part in a naval exercise in the English Channel involving 39 ships and 80 aircraft. In December, she replenished HMNZS Black Prince and HMS Sheffield in the Pacific Ocean. They were escorting the cargo liner Gothic, which Queen Elizabeth II was travelling on as part of a tour of the Commonwealth. In July 1954, she escorted RFA Wave Commander, which had been damaged in a collision with British Unity, into Gibraltar. A fight on board the ship in August 1954 resulted in the death of a crewman. He was buried in Trinidad, where the ship was when the incident occurred. Both Fife Constabulary and the Admiralty Constabulary investigated the incident.

In November 1957, Wave Baron deployed to Christmas Island as part of Operation Grapple. From November 1958 to January 1961, she was operating off Iceland in support of Royal Navy ships engaged in the First Cod War. In September 1960 she took part in a naval exercise inside the Arctic Circle. In April 1961, she took part in a NATO exercise off Malta. Between August 1961 and May 1962, she was refitted and modernised. In June 1962, Wave Baron took a number of detectives based at New Scotland Yard from Gibraltar to rendezvous with HMS Belfast. They were investigating drug smuggling on the cruiser following the discovery of $3,000,000 (~£834,000) of heroin on board after HMS Belfast had sailed from Honolulu, Hawaii, United States in May 1962. In September 1962, a crewman died in a fall on board the ship. He was buried in Bermuda. An inquest was unable to determine the exact circumstances that led to his death.

In January 1968, Wave Baron supported Royal Navy ships taking part in the search for the submarine INS Dakar, which had foundered in the Mediterranean Sea. Wave Baron was withdrawn from service in December 1969 and laid up at HMNB Devonport. She was sold for £6,500 in March 1972 to Dutch company N.V. Intershitra, but was resold. She arrived at Bilbao, Spain on 23 April 1972 for scrapping by Revalorizacion de Materials SA.
