= RFA Tidereach =

1955 Tide-class replenishment oiler of the Royal Fleet Auxiliary

- RFA Tidereach with the aircraft carrier HMS Hermes

History

United Kingdom
- Name: RFA Tidereach
- Builder: Swan Hunter & Wigham Richardson, Wallsend
- Yard number: 1847
- Laid down: 2 June 1953
- Launched: 2 June 1954
- In service: 30 August 1955
- Out of service: March 1978
- Identification: IMO number: 5361021; Pennant number: A96
- Fate: Sold for scrap, 22 February 1979

General characteristics
- Class & type: Tide-class replenishment oiler
- Displacement: 26,000 long tons (26,417 t)
- Length: 583 ft 2 in (177.75 m) o/a; 561 ft (171 m) w/l
- Beam: 71 ft 3 in (21.72 m)
- Draught: 32 ft 1 in (9.78 m)
- Propulsion: 2 × Parmetrada steam turbines; 3 × Babcock & Wilcox boilers
- Speed: 17 knots (20 mph; 31 km/h)
- Complement: 90 RFA
- Armament: Fitted for, but not with, light AA guns

RFA Tidereach (A96) was a Tide-class replenishment oiler of the Royal Fleet Auxiliary (RFA), the naval auxiliary fleet of the United Kingdom. She entered service in August 1955 and served until March 1978.

== Design and construction ==
Tidereach was planned to operate with a normal complement of 100 Royal Fleet Auxiliary personnel. She was fitted with the latest abeam rigs with automatic tension winches and an astern fuelling rig. The ship was able to carry 8,500 tons of Furnace Fuel Oil, 4,600 tons of diesel oil and 1,900 tons of avcat.

The construction of Tidereach was carried out in the north east of England by Swan Hunter. She was laid down on 2 June 1953 and was launched the following year, on 2 June 1954. She displaced fully loaded, 26,000 tons, was just over 583 ft in overall length and was capable of 17 knots.

== Operational history ==
Tidereach was involved in the 1956 Suez Crisis and was deployed as part of Operation Musketeer, actively involved between 6 November and 22 December. Two days later she arrived at Malta’s Grand Harbour along with RFA’s Brown Ranger, Wave Victor and Wave Liberator. She had been assisting the Royal Navy with the exit of Anglo-French military units out of Port Said, Egypt.

At the start of the 1960s, along with many other RFA vessels, Tidereach was involved in the 1st Cod War with Iceland, known as Operation Mint, the conflict was over fishing rights in the North Atlantic, and she deployed supporting Royal Navy warships off the coast of Iceland. The summer of 1961 saw her deploy on Operation Vantage, which was to support Kuwait against territorial claims by Iraq, where she provided material assistance for the Illustrious-class aircraft carrier Victorious in July and August, deployed along with eleven other RFA vessels.

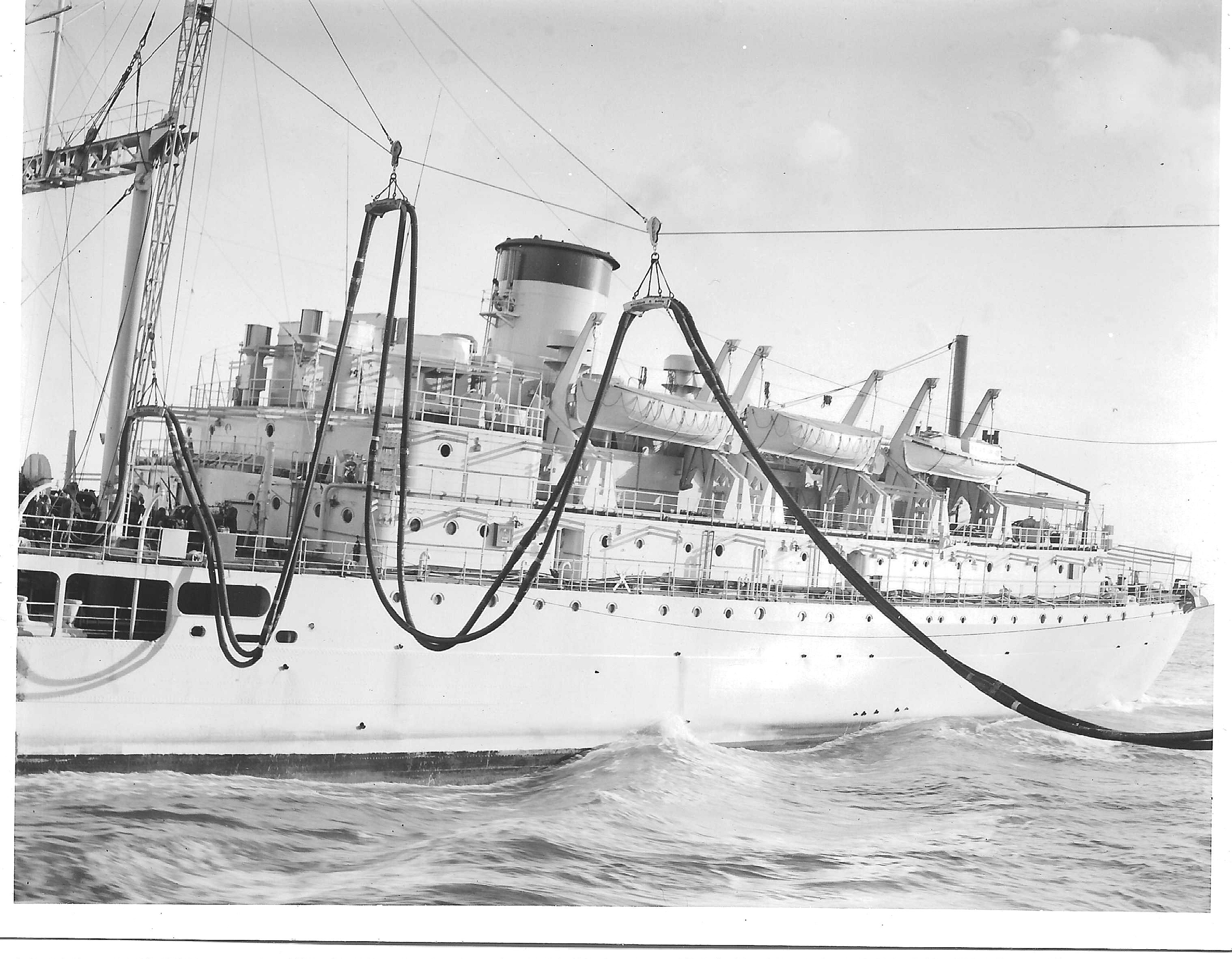
RFA Tidereach servicing HMS Ark Royal Jan 60

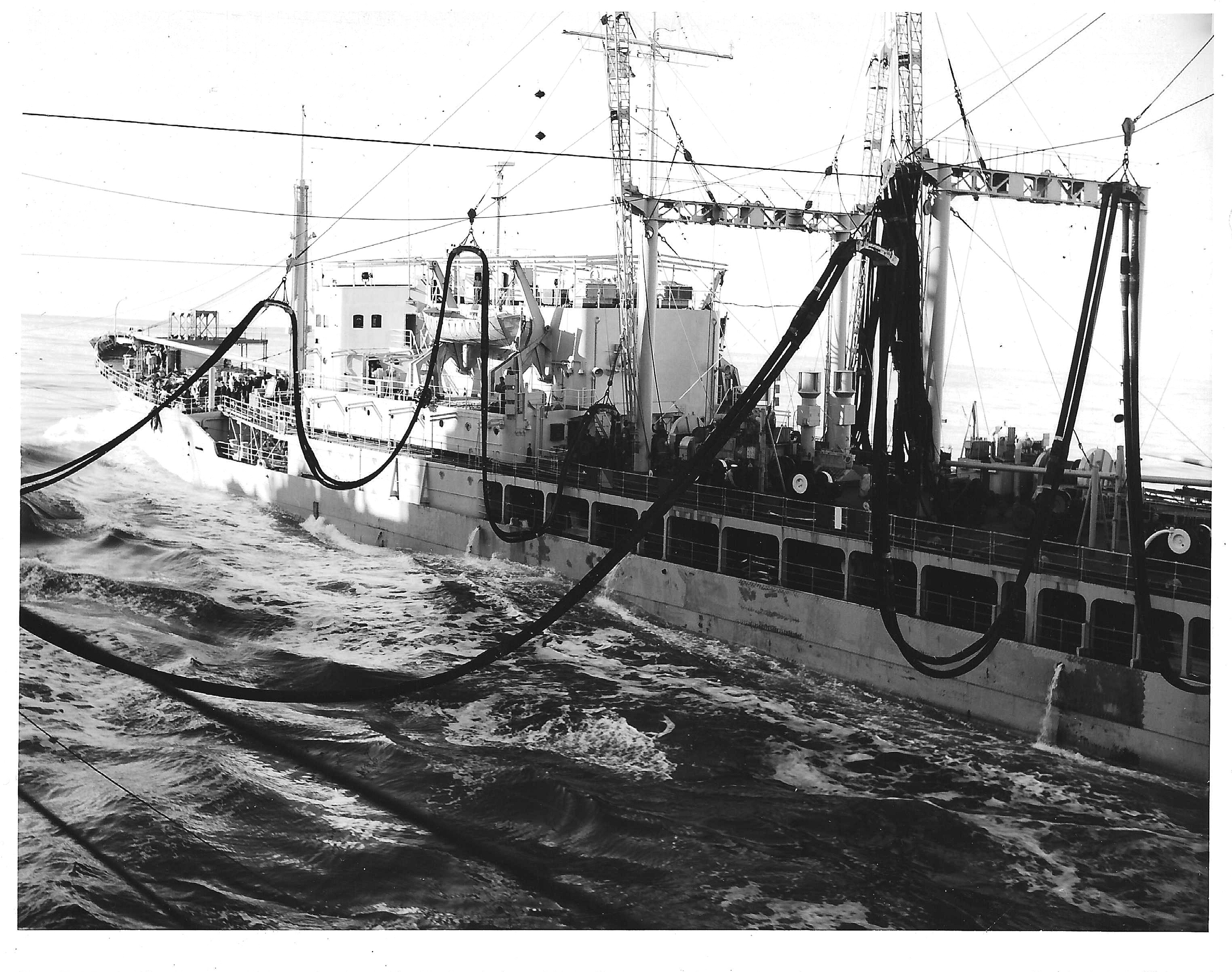
RFA Tidreach oiling HMS Ark Royal Jan 60

During 1965 Tidereach was deployed during the Indonesia–Malaysia confrontation, between January and August, to provide auxiliary support the Royal Navy in the Strait of Malacca, off Singapore and waters off the coast of Malaysia, in company with the RFA’s fleet support tanker Gold Ranger, the coastal tanker Eddyrock, the stores issuing ship Fort Charlotte and the fleet support tanker Wave Sovereign.

== Decommissioning and fate ==
She was then laid up in Portsmouth for disposal. On 22 February 1979 she was sold for scrap, and left Portsmouth under tow on 16 March 1979. On 20 March 1979 she arrived at Bilbao, Spain to be broken up.
