= RFA Wave Laird =

1946 Wave-class oiler of the Royal Fleet Auxiliary

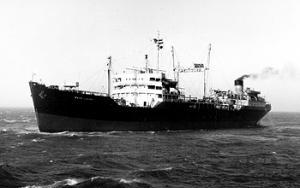

History

United Kingdom
- Name: SS Empire Dunbar (1946); RFA Wave Laird (1946-70)
- Owner: Ministry of Transport (1946); Admiralty (1946-64); Ministry of Defence (1964-70)
- Operator: Royal Fleet Auxiliary
- Port of registry: London, United Kingdom
- Builder: Sir J Laing & Sons Ltd, Sunderland
- Yard number: 767
- Launched: 3 April 1946
- Completed: 30 September 1946
- Commissioned: 30 September 1946
- Decommissioned: 1961
- Identification: United Kingdom Official Number 180967; Pennant number X129 (1946– ); Pennant Number A119 ( –1970)
- Honours and awards: Korea (1950–51)
- Fate: Scrapped at Gandia, Spain in March 1970

General characteristics
- Tonnage: 8,187 GRT; 4,562 NRT
- Displacement: 16,650 long tons full load
- Length: 493 ft 8 in (150.47 m) overall; 465 ft 0 in (141.73 m) between perpendiculars
- Beam: 64 ft 1 in (19.53 m)
- Draught: 28 ft 6 in (8.69 m)
- Depth: 35 ft 6 in (10.82 m)
- Propulsion: 2 x Metrovick-type double reduction geared steam turbines, 6,800 hp (5,100 kW).
- Speed: 15 knots (28 km/h)

RFA Wave Laird (A119) was an 8,187 GRT Wave-class fleet support tanker of the Royal Fleet Auxiliary. She was built in 1946 as Empire Dunbar by Sir J Laing & Sons Ltd, Sunderland, Co Durham for the Ministry of Transport and completed at Wave Laird. She served until 1961 when she was laid up at HMNB Devonport. Wave Laird was scrapped in 1970 in Spain.

== Description ==
The ship was built in 1946 by Sir J Laing & Sons Ltd, Sunderland. She was yard number 767. The ship was 493 feet 8 inches (150.47 m) long overall (465 feet 0 inches (141.73 m) between perpendiculars), with a beam of 64 feet 1 inch (19.53 m). She had a draught of 28 feet 6 inches (8.69 m), and a depth of 35 feet 6 inches (10.82 m). She was assessed as 8,187 gross register tons (GRT), 4,562 NRT. Fully loaded, she displaced 16,650 tons.

The ship was propelled by two Metrovick-type double reduction geared steam turbines, which were fed by three drum boilers. 6,800 shaft horsepower (5,100 kW). The turbines were built by Richardsons Westgarth Ltd. They drove a single screw propeller, and could propel the ship at 15 knots (28 km/h).

== History ==
Empire Dunbar was built by Sir J Laing & Sons Ltd, Sunderland for the Ministry of Transport. She was launched on 3 April 1946 and completed on 30 September 1946 as RFA Wave Laird for the Royal Fleet Auxiliary. Her port of registry was London. She was allocated the United Kingdom Official Number 180967 and the Pennant number X129. This was later changed to A119.

Wave Laird suffered a number of problems shortly after entering service. In October 1946, her steering gear failed on a voyage from Sunderland to the Tyne and she was towed into port. In December 1946, boiler problems delayed her departure from Portland, Dorset for Trinidad. On 17 March 1947, boiler problems left her adrift in gale-force winds 20 nautical miles (37 km) off the Tasker Rock, Ireland. Assistance was requested as the ship suffered heavy damage, which had to be repaired before her cargo was able to be discharged at Old Kilpatrick. On 10 November 1949, Wave Laird was on a voyage from Abadan, Iran to Malta when she was caught in a storm. A deckhand sustained fatal injuries. He was buried at Kalkara Naval Cemetery in Malta. The funeral was attended by officers and crew from RFA Nasprite, RFA Rowenol and Wave Laird and the Secretary of the Malta Branch of the National Union of Seamen.

Wave Laird was on active service in Korea from 25 June 1950 to 27 July 1953. She was awarded a battle honour. On 19 July 1951, she was involved in a collision with the Royal Interocean Line's ocean liner Boissevain off Singapore. In January 1954, Wave Laird was one of the naval vessels supporting the Royal Yacht Gothic in Australia. On 31 October 1956, Wave Laird was one of 35 Royal Fleet Auxiliary ships deployed as part of Operation Musketeer. From 16–29 September 1960, she was deployed off Iceland in support of the Royal Navy, which was caught up in the Cod Wars. Wave Laird was featured on a postcard produced by Valentine's, Dundee. The card showed Wave Laird refuelling HMS Scorpion at sea.

Wave Laird was laid up in reserve at HMNB Devonport in 1961. She was advertised for sale by tender in November 1969 "as lying at HMNB Devonport". She departed from Devonport under tow on 26 January 1970, bound for Gibraltar, from where she departed on 25 February under tow for Gandia, Spain. Wave Laird was scrapped in March 1970 by Hierros Ardes, Gandia.
