= RFA Wave Ruler (A212) =

1947 Wave-class oiler of the Royal Fleet Auxiliary

History
- Name: Empire Evesham (1946–1947); Wave Ruler (1947–1977)
- Owner: Ministry of Transport (1946); Admiralty (1946–1976)
- Operator: Eagle Oil & Shipping Co. (1946–1947); Royal Fleet Auxiliary (1947–1976)
- Port of registry: (United Kingdom) Middlesbrough, UK (1946–1947); (United Kingdom) Royal Fleet Auxiliary (1947–1976)
- Builder: Furness Shipbuilding Co Ltd
- Yard number: 373
- Laid down: 27 October 1944
- Launched: 17 January 1946
- Completed: April 1946
- Out of service: January 1976
- Identification: United Kingdom Official Number 180849 (1946–1977); Pennant Number A212 (1947– ); Pennant Number X135 ( –1977); Code Letters GKNR; IMO number: 5386916 ( –1977)
- Fate: Scrapped

General characteristics
- Class & type: Wave-class tanker
- Tonnage: 8,138 GRT; 4,554 NRT
- Displacement: 16,650 tons (full load)
- Length: 473 ft 6 in (144.32 m)
- Beam: 64 ft 4 in (19.61 m)
- Draught: 35 ft 4 in (10.77 m)
- Installed power: 6,800 shp
- Propulsion: Two steam turbines, double reduction geared, single screw propeller
- Speed: 14.5 knots (26.9 km/h)

Wave Ruler was a 8,138 GRT Wave-class oiler that was built in 1946 as Empire Evesham by Furness Shipbuilding Co Ltd, Haverton Hill-on-Tees, Co Durham, United Kingdom for the British Ministry of Transport. In 1947, she was transferred to the Admiralty and commissioned into the Royal Fleet Auxiliary (RFA) as Wave Ruler. She was in active service until 1970 when she was hulked in the Maldive Islands, serving RAF Gan until 1975. She was sold in 1976 and scrapped in Taiwan in 1977.

== Description ==
The ship was built in 1946 by Furness Shipbuilding Co Ltd, Haverton Hill-on-Tees, Co Durham. She was yard number 373.

The ship was 473 feet 6 inches (144.32 m) long, with a beam of 64 feet 3 inches (19.58 m). She had a draught of 35 feet 4 inches (10.77 m). She was assessed at 8,138 GRT, 4,554 NRT. Her full load displacement was 16,650 tons.

The ship was propelled by two Parsons turbines., double reduction geared, driving a single screw propeller. The turbines were made by Richardsons Westgarth & Co Ltd, West Hartlepool, Co Durham. They were rated at 6,800 shp. They could propel her at 14.5 knots (26.9 km/h). Steam was supplied by three boilers.

== History ==
Empire Evesham was laid down on 27 October 1944. She was launched on 17 January 1946. In February, she was transferred to the Admiralty. Empire Evesham was completed in April 1946. The United Kingdom Official Number 180849 was allocated. Her Code Letters were GKNR. She was placed under the management of the Eagle Oil and Shipping Company, Middlesbrough, Yorkshire.

On 7 March 1947, Empire Evesham was commissioned into the Royal Fleet Auxiliary (RFA) and renamed Wave Ruler. The Pennant number A212 was allocated. This would later be changed to X135. In May 1951, her captain refused to enter the harbour at Cairns, Queensland, Australia as there was insufficient depth of water for Wave Ruler. As a result of this, the harbour authorities purchased a dredger. On 3 April 1952, Wave Ruler caught fire whilst anchored off Greenock, Renfrewshire. At the time, she was fully laden and all non-essential personnel took to the lifeboats. The fire, which was in a pumproom, was under control within two hours. It damaged Wave Ruler's steering gear and she had to be assisted by four tugs to berth for the discharge of her cargo. On 3 October, Wave Ruler was in the Montebello Islands, Australia in support of Operation Hurricane.

On 18 September 1953, Wave Ruler lost all power off Porto, Portugal. The tugs HMS Careful and RFA Saucy were sent to her aid. On 28 September, she ran aground off Swansea, Glamorgan. Her cargo was transferred to RFA Wave Monarch on 3 October and she was refloated two days later and taken to Swansea for examination. On 1 December 1957, Wave Ruler arrived at Christmas Island to participate in Operation Grapple. From 30 September 1958 to 15 December 1960, Wave Ruler was deployed off Iceland in support of Royal Navy ships participating in the First Cod War. She was then refitted at Hebburn.

In July 1961, Wave Ruler was one of thirteen RFA ships deployed in support of the Kuwait Crisis. On 10 September 1962, she participated in Exercise Tucker Box 2 in the Coral Sea and in November she was at Perth, Western Australia where the Commonwealth Games were taking place. On 21 November, a mayday was received from the Scripps research vessel Horizon, which was off St Paul Island and had a crewmember who was critically ill. Wave Ruler responded and gave assistance. In July 1963, Wave Ruler was one of four RFA ships that escorted HMS Victorious from the United Kingdom to the Far East. In February 1965, Wave Ruler suffered a major engine breakdown off Port Said, Egypt. She slowly sailed to Malta for repairs, arriving on 10 February. In 1967, she was one of the last British naval vessels to be refitted in Malta.

On 26 August 1970, Wave Victor departed from HMNB Devonport for the Maldive Islands, where she was to replace RFA Wave Victor as a fuel hulk. She arrived on 3 October and her colours were struck for the last time on 14 October. She served until 1975, when RAF Gan closed. In October that year she was offered for sale. On 11 November, her remaining cargo was transferred to RFA Tidesurge. In January 1976, Wave Ruler was sold to Straits Engineers Contracting Private Ltd, Singapore for scrapping. She was towed to Singapore in March and laid up in the Singapore Roads. In 1977, she was sold to Taiwanese shipbreakers. Wave Ruler was scrapped that year at Kaohsiung.
