= RFA Wave Emperor =

1944 Wave-class oiler of the Royal Fleet Auxiliary

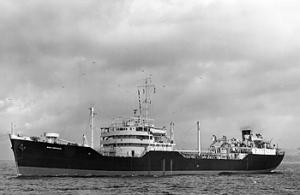

History

United Kingdom
- Name: RFA Wave Emperor
- Ordered: 3 February 1943
- Builder: Furness Shipbuilding Company, Haverton Hill
- Laid down: 19 May 1943
- Launched: 16 October 1944
- Commissioned: 20 December 1944
- Stricken: 1959
- Fate: Laid up at Portland in the late 1950s. Arrived in Barrow for demolition on 19 June 1960

General characteristics
- Class & type: Wave-class oiler
- Displacement: 16,650 tons full load
- Length: 492 ft 5 in (150.09 m)
- Beam: 64 ft 4 in (19.61 m)
- Draught: 28 ft 6 in (8.69 m)
- Propulsion: 2 x Parsons double reduction geared steam turbines. 6,800 shp. Single shaft.
- Speed: 14.5 knots

RFA Wave Emperor (A 100) was a Wave-class oiler of the Royal Fleet Auxiliary built at Haverton Hill by the Furness Shipbuilding Company.
