= Operation Musketeer (1956) =

Plan to invade Egypt

- Part of Suez Crisis
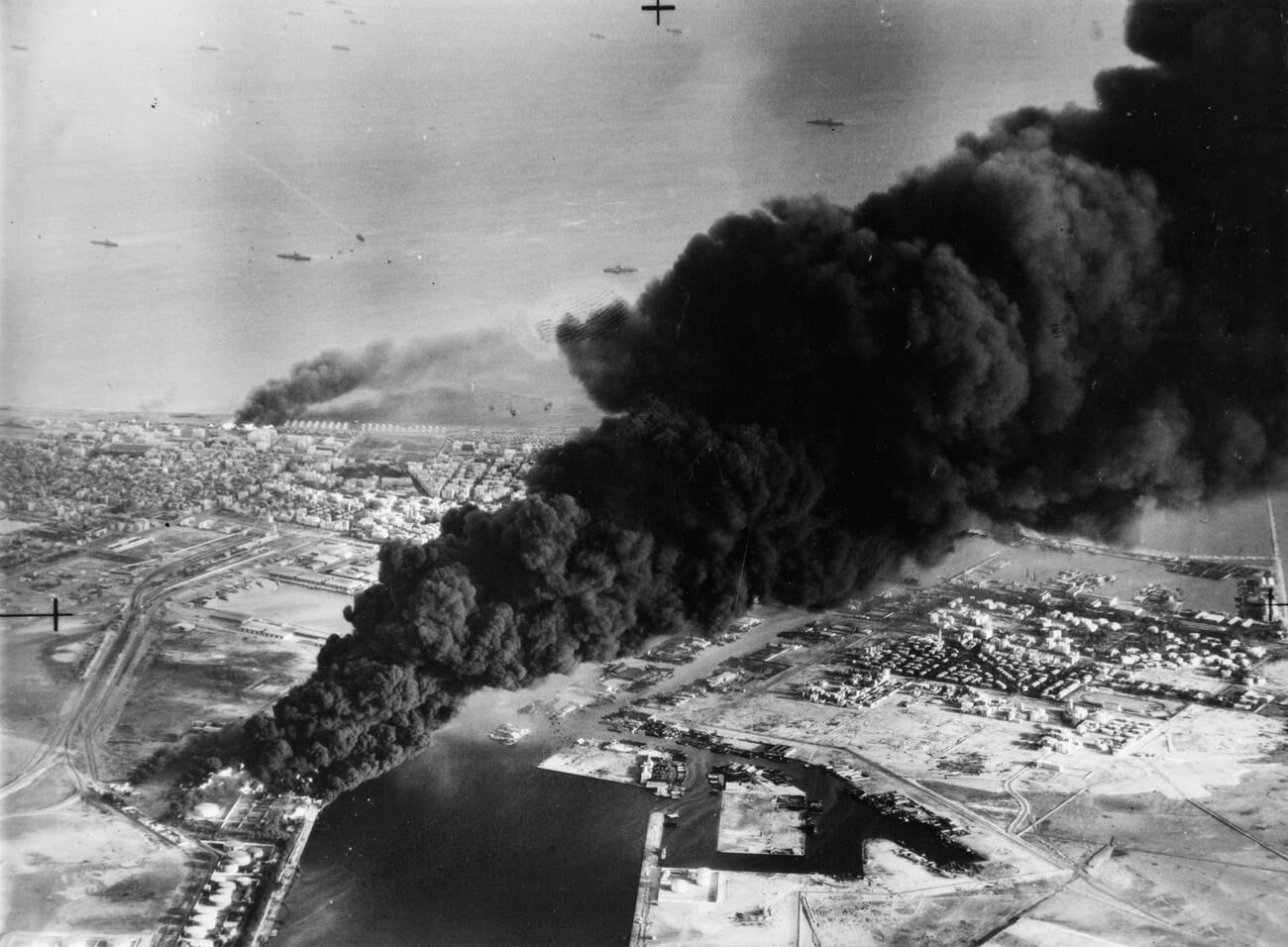
- Port Said during the 1956 Operation Musketeer
Date	November 1956
Location	Egypt and Sinai Peninsula
Result	Coalition tactical victory Egyptian strategic victory

Belligerents
United Kingdom; France; Israel	Egypt

Operation Musketeer (French: Opération Mousquetaire) was the Anglo-French plan for the invasion of the Suez Canal Zone to capture the Suez Canal during the Suez Crisis in 1956. The operation had initially been given the codename Operation Hamilcar, but this name was quickly dropped when it was found that the British were painting an air recognition letter H on their vehicles, while the French, who spelled Hamilcar differently, were painting an A. Musketeer was chosen as a replacement because it started with M in both languages. Israel, which invaded the Sinai Peninsula, had the additional objectives of opening the Straits of Tiran and halting fedayeen incursions into Israel. The Anglo-French military operation was originally planned for early September, but the necessity of coordination with Israel delayed it until early November. However, on 10 September British and French politicians and Chiefs of the General Staff agreed to adopt General Charles Keightley's alterations to the military plans with the intention of reducing Egyptian civilian casualties. The new plan, renamed Musketeer Revise, provided the basis of the actual Suez operation.

== The operation ==
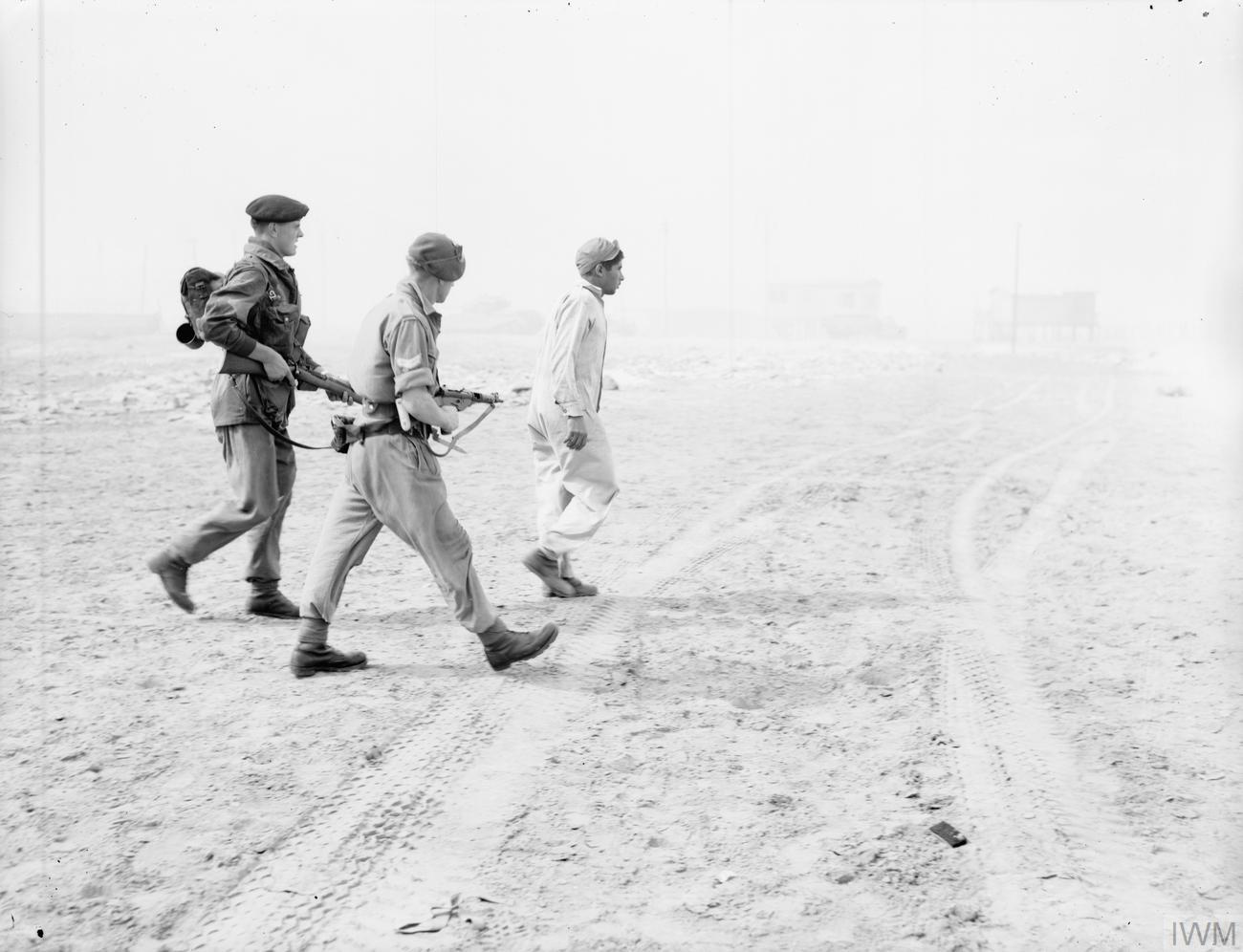
Troops of the Parachute Regiment escort a captured Egyptian soldier at Port Said

Headed by British Army General Charles Keightley, it was conducted in November 1956 in close coordination with the Israeli armoured thrust into the Sinai, which was called Operation Kadesh. Egypt's government, led by Colonel Gamal Abdel Nasser, was seeking political control over the canal, an effort resisted by the Europeans. The army was originally to land at Alexandria, but the location was later switched to Port Said since a landing at Alexandria would have been opposed by most of the Egyptian army, necessitating the deployment of an armoured division. Furthermore, a preliminary bombardment of a densely populated area would have involved tens of thousands of civilian casualties. The naval bombardment of Port Said was rendered less effective by the decision to only use 4.5-inch guns instead of large caliber guns, in order to minimise the number of civilian casualties.

The final land order of battle involved the Royal Marine Commando Brigade, the 16th Parachute Brigade, and the 3rd Infantry Division. To bring these formations to war establishment, the regular army reserve and selected national service reservists were mobilised. Most of the latter were sent to units in home stations (Britain and Germany) to replace regulars posted to the Musketeer force. Lieutenant General Sir Hugh Stockwell was appointed to command the landing force. A French parachute brigade joined 16th Parachute Brigade as it returned to Cyprus. The Commando Brigade completed refresher training in shore landings from helicopters, in association with the Mediterranean fleet, which was preparing to support the amphibious operation. Over the summer the Royal Air Force selected a range of targets whose loss would cripple Egyptian resistance.

Details of the secret plan for Israeli forces to invade the Sinai desert were revealed to the Chiefs of the Defence staff in October. On 29 October Israeli armour, preceded by parachute drops on two key passes, thrust south into the Sinai, routing local Egyptian forces within five days. Affecting to be alarmed by the threat of fighting along the Suez Canal, the UK and France issued a twelve-hour ultimatum on 30 October to the Israelis and the Egyptians to cease fighting. When, as expected, no response was given, Operation Musketeer was launched.

The air offensive began. The 3rd Division, minus the Guards Brigade, embarked on 1 November. The 45th Commando and 16th Parachute Brigade landed by sea and air on 5 November. Although landing forces quickly established control over major canal facilities, the Egyptians were able to sink obstacles in the canal, rendering it unusable. The Anglo-French air offensive suppressed Egyptian airfields not already attacked by the Israelis, but failed to destroy oil stocks or cripple the Egyptian army. Cairo Radio continued to broadcast. The 3rd Battalion Parachute group captured El Cap airfield by airborne assault. The remaining units, held back initially for deep airborne targets, travelled by sea to Port Said. The Commando Brigade captured all its objectives. The French parachutists took Port Fuad, opposite Port Said. Elements of the 16th Parachute Brigade led by Brigadier M.A.H. Butler and a contingent of the Royal Tank Regiment set off south along the canal bank on 6 November to capture Ismailia.

== Reaction ==
Worldwide reaction against Musketeer was massive and negative. The United States unexpectedly led condemnations of the action at the United Nations and in other forums, marking a sharp break in the "special relationship" between the United States and the United Kingdom. Of the countries in the Commonwealth, only Australia, South Africa and New Zealand supported the military operation, with Canada strongly opposing it. Just before midnight Brigadier Mervyn Butler was ordered to stop on the hour, when a ceasefire would come into effect. This raised a difficulty. There were Egyptian forces ahead; the British column was in open desert with no defensible feature to hand. Butler compromised, advancing until 0:15 a.m. to reach El Cap, where he sited the 2nd Battalion of the Parachute Regiment, with supporting detachments.

While the military operation itself had been completely successful, political pressure from the United States obliged the British and French governments to accept the ceasefire terms drawn up by the United Nations. The 3rd Division landed to relieve the parachutists. While accepting a United Nations Emergency Force to replace the Anglo-French presence, Nasser nevertheless ensured the Canal could not be used by sinking or otherwise disabling 49 ships in the channel. Anglo-French forces were withdrawn by 22 December.

== End of operation ==
When the United States threatened to devalue the British currency (the Pound Sterling), the British cabinet was divided. Prime Minister Sir Anthony Eden called a ceasefire, without Israeli or French officials being notified. This caused France to doubt the reliability of its allies. A few months later, French president René Coty ordered the creation of the brand new military experiments facility C.S.E.M. in the Sahara. It was used by his successor Charles de Gaulle to develop an autonomous nuclear deterrent against potential threats. The French atomic bomb Gerboise Bleue was tested in February 1960. In 1966, de Gaulle further loosened his ties with the Western Allies by leaving NATO's peacetime command structure.

== Naval support ==
Britain had a treaty with Jordan, and had a plan (Cordage) to give assistance to Jordan in the event of an attack by Israel. This led to the First Lord of the Admiralty (Hailsham) sending a memo to Eden on 2 October 1956 proposing the use of the light cruiser HMS Royalist for Cordage as well as Musketeer. HMS Royalist had just been modernised as an anti-aircraft radar picket ship, and was regarded as the most suitable ship for protection against the Mystère fighter-bombers supplied by France to Israel. But HMS Royalist had just been transferred to the Royal New Zealand Navy, and New Zealand's Prime Minister Sidney Holland did not in the end allow the Royalist to be used with the British fleet in the Mediterranean for Cordage or Musketeer (where her presence would indicate support by New Zealand). The memo indicates that Hailsham did not know of the negotiations of Eden and Lloyd with France and Israel for concerted moves against Egypt.

== Aftermath ==
Operation Musketeer was a failure in strategic terms. By mischance it covered the Soviet Union's military intervention in Hungary on 4 November. On this issue and, more generally, on the principle of premature military action against Egypt, the operation divided public opinion in both the UK and France. It demonstrated the limitations of British as well as French military capacity, and exposed errors in several staff functions, notably intelligence and movement control. It was tactically successful for both countries, both in the sea and airborne assaults and the subsequent brief occupation.

== French order of battle ==
=== French Navy ===
- French battleship Jean Bart (1940)
- French aircraft carrier La Fayette
- French aircraft carrier Arromanches
  - Between them, 36 Vought F4U Corsairs.
- French light cruiser Georges Leygues
- a number of escorteurs and destroyers.
- Submarine (search and rescue): Créole

=== Ground forces ===
Most French units involved came from the 10th Parachute Division (10e DP).

- 2nd Colonial Infantry Parachute Regiment (2e RPC).
- 11th Shock Parachute Regiment (11e Choc).
- 1st Foreign Parachute Regiment (1er REP).
- 4 Commandos Marine:
  - Commando Jaubert
  - Commando de Montfort
  - Commando de Penfentenyo
  - Commando Hubert
- Two squadrons of the 2nd Foreign Cavalry Regiment (2e REC) comprising AMX-13 tanks.
- Two squadrons of M47 Patton tanks.
- One sapper company.

== United Kingdom order of battle ==
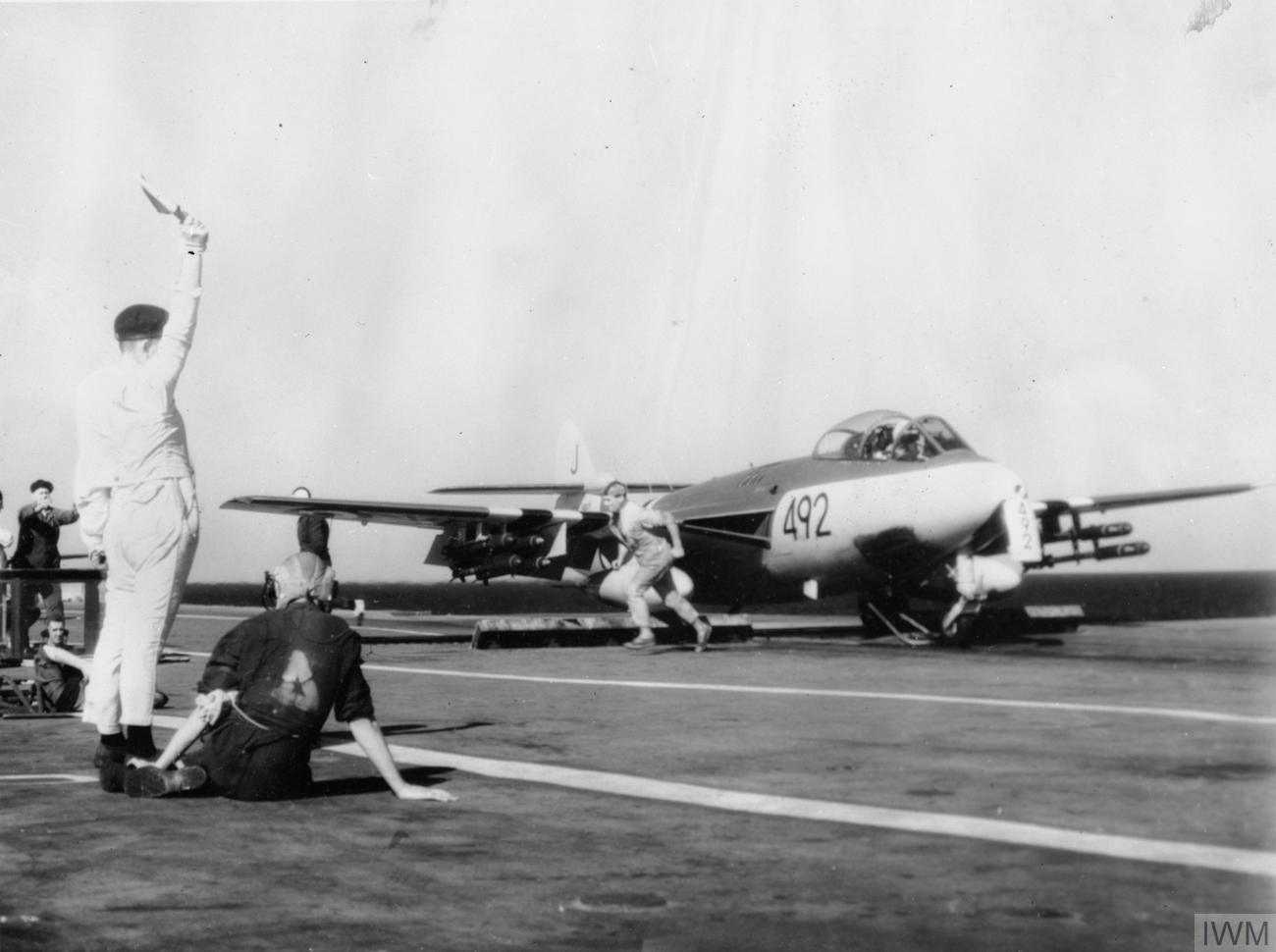
A Hawker Sea Hawk of 899 Naval Air Squadron, armed with rockets, about to be launched from the aircraft carrier HMS Eagle for a strike on an Egyptian airfield

=== Royal Air Force ===
- No. 1 Squadron RAF with Hawker Hunter F.5's.
- No. 6 Squadron RAF with de Havilland Venom FB.4's.
- No. 8 Squadron RAF with Venom FB.4's.
- No. 9 Squadron RAF with English Electric Canberra B.6's.
- No. 10 Squadron RAF with Canberra B.2's.
- No. 12 Squadron RAF with Canberra B.6's.
- No. 13 Squadron RAF with Canberra PR.7's.
- No. 15 Squadron RAF with Canberra B.2's.
- No. 18 Squadron RAF with Canberra B.2's.
- No. 27 Squadron RAF with Canberra B.2's.
- No. 30 Squadron RAF with Vickers Valetta C.1's.
- No. 34 Squadron RAF with Hunter F.5's.
- No. 35 Squadron RAF with Canberra B.2's
- No. 37 Squadron RAF with Shackleton MR.2's
- No. 39 Squadron RAF with Gloster Meteor NF.13's.
- No. 44 Squadron RAF with Canberra B.2's.
- No. 53 Squadron RAF with Handley Page Hastings
- No. 58 Squadron RAF with Canberra PR.7's
- No. 61 Squadron RAF with Canberra B.2's.
- No. 70 Squadron RAF with Hastings C.1 and C.2's
- No. 84 Squadron RAF Valetta C.1's
- No. 99 Squadron RAF with Handley Page Hastings C.1 & C.2's.
- No. 101 Squadron RAF with Canberra B.6's.
- No. 109 Squadron RAF with Canberra B.6's.
- No. 114 Squadron RAF with Valetta C.1's
- No. 115 Squadron RAF with Canberra B.2's
- No. 138 Squadron RAF with Vickers Valiant B.1's, B(PR) 1's, B(PR)K 1's and B(K) 1's.
- No. 139 Squadron RAF with Canberra B.6's.
- No. 148 Squadron RAF with Valiant B.1's, B(PR) 1's, B(PR)K 1's and B(K) 1's.
- No. 207 Squadron RAF with Valiant B.1's, B(PR) 1's and B(K) 1's.
- No. 208 Squadron RAF with Meteor FR.9's
- No. 214 Squadron RAF with Valiant B.1's, B(PR) 1's, B(PR)K 1's and B(K) 1's.
- No. 249 Squadron RAF with Venom FB.4's
- No. 511 Squadron RAF with Hastings C.1 & C.2's.
- No. 48 (Field) Squadron, RAF Regiment, to defend El Gamil airfield from Egyptian ground attack.

=== British Army ===
- Gordon Highlanders
- Cheshire Regiment
- The Parachute Regiment, 1st, 2nd, and 3rd Battalions
- Guards Independent Parachute Company
- 6th Royal Tank Regiment
- 1st Royal Dragoons
- 1st Battalion Royal West Kent Regiment
- 1st Battalion, the Royal Scots
- 1st Battalion The Royal Fusiliers (City of London Regt.)
- Oxfordshire and Buckinghamshire Light Infantry
- Highland Light Infantry
- Argyll and Sutherland Highlanders
- York and Lancaster Regiment
- Royal Warwickshire Regiment
- 1st Battalion West Yorkshire Regiment
- Royal Berkshire Regiment - anti-tank platoon only
- 3rd Battalion Grenadier Guards - one machine gun platoon only
- Royal Artillery, units from
  - 20th Field Regiment,
  - 23rd Field Regiment
  - 32nd Medium Regiment
  - 33rd Airborne
  - 33rd Parachute Regiment
    - 97 Battery (Lawson's Company) Royal Artillery
  - 34th Light Anti-Aircraft Regiment
  - 41st Field Regiment
  - 80th Light Anti-Aircraft Regiment
- 9 Independent Parachute Field Squadron RE from the Royal Engineers

These were supported by units from:

- Royal Engineers
- Royal Military Police
- Royal Electrical Mechanical Engineers
- Royal Signals
- Royal Army Ordnance Corps
- Royal Pioneer Corps
- Royal Army Service Corps
- Royal Army Medical Corps
- Intelligence Corps

=== Royal Marines ===
- 3rd Commando Brigade Royal Marines

=== Royal Navy ===
- 1st Destroyer Squadron; HMS Chieftain, HMS Chevron, HMS Chaplet
- 2nd Destroyer Squadron; HMS Daring
- 3rd Destroyer Squadron; HMS Armada, HMS Barfleur, HMS Gravelines, HMS St. Kitts
- 4th Destroyer Squadron; HMS Alamein, HMS Corunna, HMS Barrosa, HMS Agincourt
- 6th Destroyer Squadron: HMS Cavendish
- 5th Frigate Squadron: HMS Wakeful, HMS Whirlwind, HMS Wizard
- 6th Frigate Squadron: HMS Undine, HMS Urania, HMS Ulysses, HMS Ursa
- Aircraft carriers: HMS Albion, HMS Bulwark, HMS Eagle, HMS Ocean, HMS Theseus
- Tank landing ships: HMS Anzio, HMS Bastion, HMS Buttress, HMS Citadel, HMS Counterguard, HMS Evan Gibb, HMS Empire Cymric, HMS Empire Cedric, HMS Empire Celtic, HMS Empire Doric, HMS Lofoten, HMS Loftus, HMS Empire Baltic, HMS Portcullis, HMS Parapet, HMS Puncher, HMS Rampart, HMS Ravager, HMS Redoubt, HMS Striker, HMS Reggio, HMS Sallyport, HMS Salerno, HMS Suvla
- Minesweepers: HMS Appleton, HMS Darlaston, HMS Letterson, HMS Leverton, HMS Penstone
- Net-layers: HMS Barnstone, HMS Barhill
- Cruisers: HMS Bermuda, HMS Ceylon, HMS Jamaica, HMS Newfoundland
- HMS Childers (destroyer)
- HMS Comet (destroyer)
- HMS Contest (destroyer)
- HMS Decoy (destroyer)
- HMS Defender (destroyer)
- HMS Delight (destroyer)
- HMS Diana (destroyer)
- HMS Diamond (destroyer)
- HMS Duchess (destroyer)
- HMS Crane (sloop)
- HMS Modeste (sloop)
- HMS Meon (frigate)
- HMS Dalrymple (survey vessel)
- Submarine depot ships: HMS Forth, HMS Rampura
- HMS Manxman (Minelayer)
- HMS Tyne (Headquarters ship)
- HMS Woodbridge Haven (Depot ship)
- HMMRC1097 (Landing craft repair ship)
- Submarines: HMS Sea Devil, HMS Sentinel, HMS Totem, HMS Trenchant (Believed to be in area at the time)
- Submarine (search and rescue): HMS Tudor

=== Fleet Air Arm ===
- 800 Naval Air Squadron with Hawker Sea Hawks.
- 802 Naval Air Squadron with Hawker Sea Hawks.
- 804 Naval Air Squadron with Hawker Sea Hawks.
- 809 Naval Air Squadron with de Havilland Sea Venoms.
- 810 Naval Air Squadron with Hawker Sea Hawks.
- 830 Naval Air Squadron with Westland Wyverns.
- 831 Naval Air Squadron with Westland Wyverns.
- 845 Naval Air Squadron with Westland Whirlwinds.
- 'A' Flight of 849 Naval Air Squadron with Douglas Skyraiders.
- 'B' Flight of 849 Naval Air Squadron with Douglas Skyraiders.
- 891 Naval Air Squadron with de Havilland Sea Venoms.
- 893 Naval Air Squadron with de Havilland Sea Venoms.
- 894 Naval Air Squadron with de Havilland Sea Venoms.
- 895 Naval Air Squadron with de Havilland Sea Venoms.
- 897 Naval Air Squadron with Hawker Sea Hawks.
- 899 Naval Air Squadron with Hawker Sea Hawks.
- Joint Experimental Helicopter Unit with Westland Whirlwinds and Bristol Sycamores.

=== Royal Fleet Auxiliary ===
- RFA Blue Ranger (tanker)
- RFA Brown Ranger (tanker)
- RFA Fort Sandusky (stores ship)
- RFA Kinbrace (A281) (coastal salvage vessel)
- RFA Spapool (water carrier)
- RFA Tideflow (tanker)
- RFA Tidereach (tanker)
- RFA Tiderace (tanker)
- RFA Wave Knight (tanker)
- RFA Wave Master (tanker)
- RFA Wave Sovereign (tanker)
- RFA Swin (salvage vessel)
- RFA Uplifter (salvage vessel)
- RFA Retainer (A329) (ammunition and stores)

=== Civilian auxiliary ships ===
- Ascania (troopship)
- Asturias (troopship)
- Ausdauer (chartered heavy-lifting vessel)
- M/V Dispenser (salvage lifting vessel)
- Dilwara (troopship)
- Dunera (troopship)
- Empire Fowey (troopship)
- Empire Gaelic (troopship)
- Empire Ken (troopship)
- Empire Parkeston (troopship)
- Energie (chartered heavy-lifting vessel)
- SS Kingsbury (troopship)
- New Australia (troopship)
- MV Salinas (cargo ship)

=== Royal New Zealand Navy ===
- HMNZS Royalist (cruiser), with the carrier group as a radar picket until 2 November, "but was ordered not to take part in any operations".

== See also ==
- Protocol of Sèvres
- Suez Crisis
- Closure of the Suez Canal (1956-1957)
