= RFA Wave Conqueror =

Wave-class oiler of the Royal Fleet Auxiliary

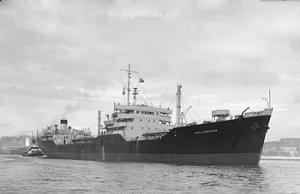
- RFA Wave Conqueror, pictured in 1952.

History

United Kingdom
- Name: SS Empire Law; RFA Wave Conqueror
- Operator: Royal Fleet Auxiliary
- Builder: Furness Shipbuilding Company, Haverton Hill
- Launched: 27 November 1943
- Honours and awards: Korea, 1951–53
- Fate: Scrapped in 1960

General characteristics
- Tonnage: 8,187 gross register tons (GRT)
- Displacement: 16,483 tons full load
- Length: 492 ft 8 in (150.16 m)
- Beam: 64 ft 4 in (19.61 m)
- Draught: 28 ft 6 in (8.69 m)
- Propulsion: 2 x Metrovick double reduction geared steam turbines, 6,800 hp (5,100 kW).
- Speed: 14.5 knots (26.9 km/h)

RFA Wave Conqueror was a Wave-class fleet support tanker of the Royal Fleet Auxiliary that was built in 1943, as SS Empire Law by the Furness Shipbuilding Company, Haverton Hill, United Kingdom.

She saw service during the Korean War and was scrapped in 1960.
