= RFA Wave Victor =

1946 Wave-class oiler of the Royal Fleet Auxiliary

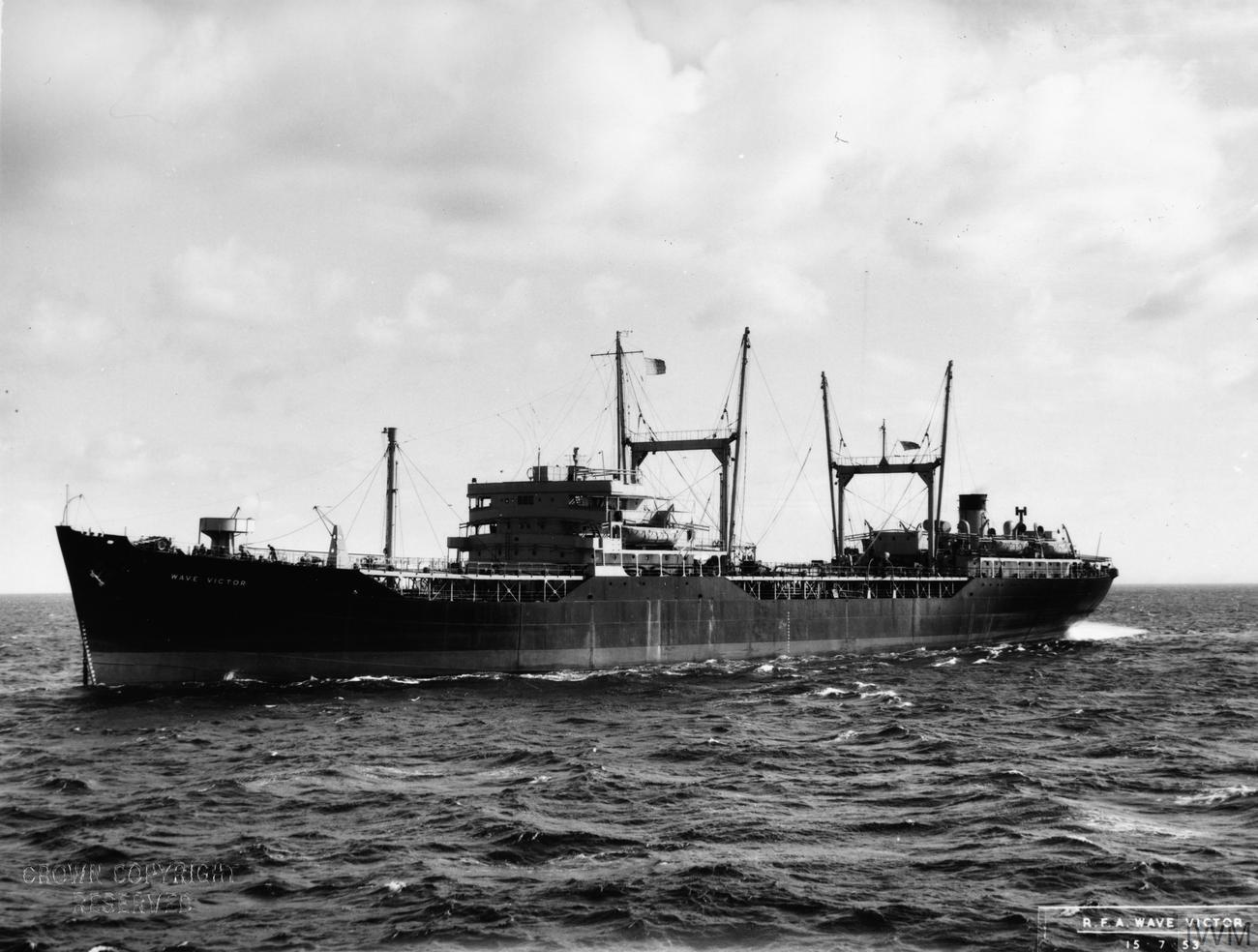
- RFA Wave Victor

History

United Kingdom
- Name: SS Empire Bounty (1943-46); RFA Wave Victor (1946-74)
- Owner: Ministry of War Transport (1943-46); Royal Fleet Auxiliary (1946-81)
- Operator: Anglo Saxon Petroleum Co Ltd (1944-46); Royal Fleet Auxiliary (1946-60); Air Ministry (1960-81)
- Port of registry: (United Kingdom) Middlesbrough (1944-46)
- Builder: Furness Shipbuilding Company, Haverton Hill-on-Tees
- Yard number: 356
- Laid down: 16 November 1942
- Launched: 30 September 1943
- Completed: February 1944
- Identification: UK Official Number 169126 (1943-46); Code Letters GCBT (1944-46); Pennant Number X130 (1946-60), A220 (1960-81)
- Fate: Transferred to the Air Ministry as a refuelling hulk; Hulked in 1975; Scrapped in 1981

General characteristics
- Tonnage: 8,187 gross register tons (GRT)
- Displacement: 16,483 long tons full load
- Length: 492 ft 8 in (150.16 m) LOA; 473 ft 8 in (144.37 m) (registered length)
- Beam: 64 ft 3 in (19.58 m)
- Draught: 28 ft 6 in (8.69 m)
- Depth: 35 ft 4 in (10.77 m)
- Installed power: 3 drum type boilers; 6,800 hp (5,100 kW)
- Propulsion: Two Parsons double reduction geared turbines; Single screw
- Speed: 14.5 knots (26.9 km/h)
- Complement: 60

RFA Wave Victor (A220) was an 8,187 GRT Wave-class fleet support tanker of the Royal Fleet Auxiliary built at Haverton Hill-on-Tees by Furness Shipbuilding Company. She was built in 1942 as Empire Bounty for the Ministry of War Transport (MoWT). She was transferred to the Royal Fleet Auxiliary in 1946 and renamed Wave Victor with Pennant number X130. Her pennant number was later changed to A220. She served until scrapped in 1981.

== Description ==
Empire Bounty was laid down at the yards of the Furness Shipbuilding Company, Haverton Hill-on-Tees on 16 November 1942. She was yard number 356. Empire Bounty was launched on 30 September 1943 and completed in February 1944. Empire Bounty was recorded on Lloyd's Register as being 473 feet 8 inches (144.37 m) long, with a beam of 64 feet 3 inches (19.58 m) and a depth of 35 feet 4 inches (10.77 m). She was propelled by two steam turbines driving a single screw. The turbines were made by Richardsons, Westgarth & Co Ltd, Hartlepool.

== Career ==
=== Empire Bounty ===
Empire Bounty entered service for the MoWT, and was operated on their behalf by the Anglo-Saxon Petroleum Company, of London. Her Official Number was 169126 and she used the Code Letters GCBT.

Empire Bounty was a member of a number of convoys during the Second World War, mostly between Liverpool and New York. Her first crossing was with Convoy UC 14, leaving Liverpool on 1 March 1944 and arriving at New York on 11 March. She returned to America with Convoy UC 28, departing Liverpool on 1 July 1944 and arriving at New York on 12 July. Empire Bounty made one further voyage to New York that year, leaving Liverpool on 28 December and reaching her destination on 8 January 1945, having sailed via Belfast Lough. She returned to Britain with Convoy CU 54, departing New York on 19 January 1945 and reaching Liverpool on 22 January, from where she made for the Isle of Grain.

Empire Bounty sailed with four more convoys before the end of the war, all between Liverpool and New York. She sailed from Liverpool with Convoy UC 54A on 28 January 1945, arriving on 9 February. Empire Bounty sailed from Milford Haven on 29 January. She returned with Convoy CU 59, departing on 19 February 1945 and arriving at Liverpool on 1 March, from where she headed to the Clyde. Two journeys back to America with convoys followed, with Convoy UC 59A between 6 March 1945 and 17 March, having sailed from Milford Haven, and with Convoy UC 66A from 2 May 1945 to 13 May. Empire Bounty put into Fayal with an unspecified defect that her master stated could only be repaired in the United Kingdom. She sailed from Fayal on 17 May and arrived at West Hartlepool on 29 May. Repairs took until 23 June to complete.

=== Wave Victor ===
Empire Bounty and the remaining MOWT operated tankers of her class were transferred to the Royal Fleet Auxiliary in 1946 and Empire Bounty was renamed Wave Victor. She was allocated Pennant number X130.

In 1952, there was a fire on board Wave Victor whilst she was anchored off Greenock, Renfrewshire. On 17 January 1954, Wave Victor was sailing down the Bristol Channel when a fire broke out in the engine room. The fire was reported at 17:24, and five minutes later was stated to be "out of control". At 17:37 a message was broadcast by radio that the ship was to be abandoned. Several tugs and lifeboats, as well as the corvette HMS Carisbrooke Castle came out to the ship, but by then the fire was raging out of control and the crew abandoned her, fearing the explosion of her bunkers. The tug Nirumand brought six firemen from Swansea to the ship, which was 9 nautical miles (17 km) off Bull Point, Devon. Acting Chief Engineer George McBain remained aboard so the vessel could not be claimed by private tugs under marine salvage laws. The ship continued to drift, and after some time several of the crew and a fire fighting team re-boarded her and brought the fire under control. The fire was extinguished by 12:00 the next day. She was subsequently towed back to Swansea, and then to Wallsend on Tyne to be repaired.

She was loaned to the Air Ministry in 1960, and transferred to Gan, the location of RAF Gan, as a refuelling hulk. She remained in this role until replaced in 1971 by RFA Wave Ruler, and was then laid up in Manila Bay in 1975.She was finally scrapped in 1981.
