= Special address by the British monarch =

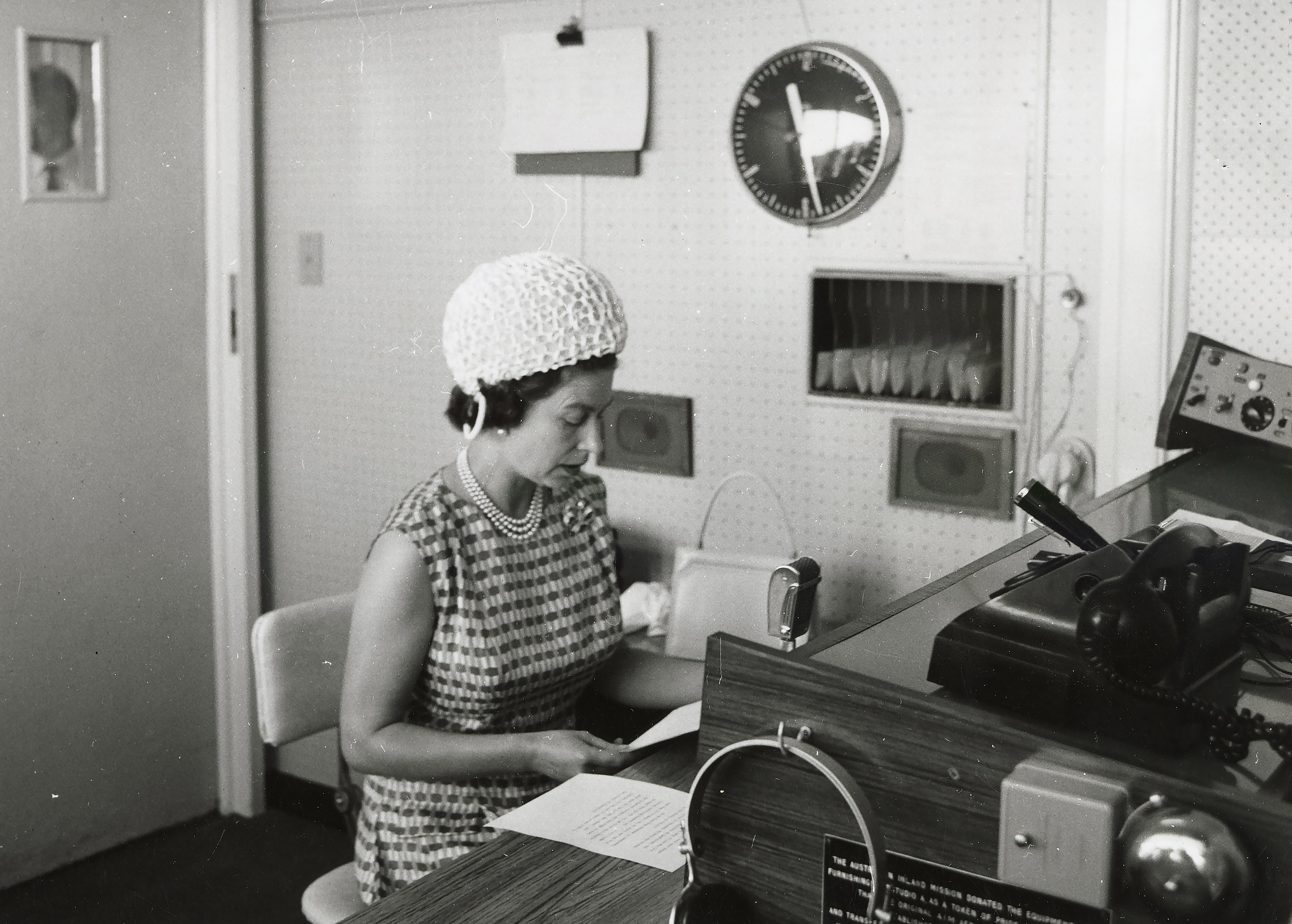
Elizabeth II, Queen of Australia, broadcasting a speech from the Royal Flying Doctors Base at Mt Isa, Queensland, 1970

Special addresses by the monarch of the United Kingdom and other Commonwealth realms (and previously of the British Empire and its Dominions), outside the annual Royal Christmas Message and the Commonwealth Day Message, only take place at times of significant national or royal events.

It was only in the 20th century, with the advent of radio, that the monarch was able to address all their subjects at once. On Christmas Day in 1932, King George V became the first monarch to make a live radio broadcast to the Commonwealth. The tradition of the monarch's Christmas Day broadcast continues to this day. Special addresses by the monarch on days other than Christmas Day, however, are extremely rare and have occurred only at times of significant national or royal events.

== List of special addresses ==
This list does not include Empire Day and Commonwealth Day broadcasts.

=== George V ===
Date	Subject	Notes	Ref
6 May 1935	Silver Jubilee	A speech made by King George V at the end of the celebrations of his Silver Jubilee. He thanked all his peoples on behalf of himself and Queen Mary. It was also the first broadcast by him outside the Royal Christmas Message.	

=== Edward VIII ===
Date	Subject	Notes	Ref
1 March 1936	Accession to the throne	Edward VIII's first radio address to the Empire after the death of his father, George V, on 20 January 1936.	
26 July 1936	Unveiling of Canadian National Vimy Memorial	The unveiling ceremony for the Canadian war memorial was broadcast live to Canada through the Canadian Radio Broadcasting Commission. The ceremony included a speech from the King in both English and French.	
11 December 1936	Abdication crisis	The former King made a speech to the Empire from Windsor Castle having abdicated just hours earlier. He was introduced by Sir John Reith as "His Royal Highness Prince Edward".	

=== George VI ===
Date	Subject	Notes	Ref
12 May 1937	Coronation of George VI and Elizabeth	George VI made the speech on the evening of his coronation.	
3 September 1939	Outbreak of World War II	The King made the speech hours after the United Kingdom declared war on Germany. A dramatisation of the radio broadcast forms the "climax" of the 2010 film The King's Speech.	
23 September 1940	First year of World War II	The King made the speech just over a year after the outbreak of the war. In the speech, he announced the creation of the George Cross.	
6 June 1944	Normandy landings	The King addressed the Allies on the evening of the D-Day landings.	
8 May 1945	Victory in Europe Day	The King's speech to celebrate VE Day after the surrender of Nazi Germany. He also warned that the war with Japan still had to be won.	
15 August 1945	Victory over Japan Day and end of World War II	The King addressed the Empire at the end of the war.	

=== Elizabeth II ===
Contingent Address – Never delivered

Date	Subject	Notes	Ref
2 June 1953	Coronation of Elizabeth II	Following her coronation on 2 June 1953, Queen Elizabeth II made a broadcast in the evening. She reflected on the events of the day, thanked the public for their support and promised to serve the Commonwealth and Empire.	
29 January 1954	Farewell broadcast to New Zealand	Before leaving New Zealand in 1954, the Queen broadcast a message of thanks to New Zealand and to its "great and united people" from Invercargill, at the tip of New Zealand's South Island on 29 January. In the broadcast, she said that she and Prince Philip "have been deeply impressed" by the way in which New Zealand's manifold natural resources are being developed with the aid of science and technical skill. She added that with the spontaneous enthusiasm and affection that she and Prince Philip were greeted to "this beautiful country", they were truly made to feel at home.	
18 March 1954	Visit to Broken Hill	On 18 March 1954, during her first tour of Australia, the Queen flew into Broken Hill with her husband, the Duke of Edinburgh. The Queen made a speech from the Flying Doctor Base, which was broadcast throughout the entire Australian Outback via the Flying Doctor Network. Mrs Mitchell, from the Muloorina station, spoke to the Queen on behalf of the Outback residents, after which the Queen broadcast her reply to all the Outback people. The Queen spoke of the fortitude, courage, humour and friendliness of the Outback residents, and of the "magnificent way in which you have overcome the problems of living in this region of vast distances and great loneliness".	
1 April 1954	Farewell broadcast to Australia	The Queen broadcast a farewell speech upon her departure from Australia on 1 April 1954. The Queen and Prince Philip left Australia on Gothic, and as the royal yacht was slowly making its way out of the Swan River into the Indian Ocean, the Queen left the top deck to make her farewell broadcast to Australia and its people. All ABC stations broadcast the speech throughout Australia, and the Queen's voice was heard between 7:30 and 8 pm. In the speech, the Queen thanked the Australian people for their "welcome, hospitality and loyalty". She added that "it is demonstrated that the Crown is a human link between all the people who owe allegiance to me, an allegiance of mutual love and respect and never of compulsion". The Queen said "I hope that this visit has served to remind you of the wonderful heritage we share".	
10 April 1954	Special broadcast to the people of Ceylon	Elizabeth II, Queen of Ceylon, and the Duke of Edinburgh arrived in Ceylon on 10 April 1954 for a ten-day royal tour. After attending a civic reception at Colombo Town Hall on 10 April, the Queen broadcast a special message to the people of Ceylon over Radio Ceylon later that afternoon. In her message, the Queen said: "I hope that my presence here will give you a new sense of unity and nationhood and will help you to feel your membership of that vital family of nations which shares the same hopes and ideals".	
21 April 1954	Farewell broadcast to Ceylon	Upon her departure from Ceylon, the Queen broadcast a farewell message onboard Gothic, to the Ceylonese people. The Queen spoke via Radio Ceylon in the evening of her birthday in 1954. In the broadcast, the Queen said that the welcome given to her and Prince Philip in city and countryside had brought them very near to the people of Ceylon, and they would have liked to stay longer on this "beautiful island". She added that Ceylon's past is long and famous, and she was convinced that the future held even more for Ceylon and for her people.	(Transcript)
15 February 1956	Farewell broadcast to Nigeria	Queen Elizabeth II bid farewell to the Nigerian people in a broadcast speech, on the conclusion of the Royal tour of Nigeria. The Queen, wearing a pearl encrusted dress and necklace, sitting in front of two microphones, spoke from Government House in Lagos, on the evening of 15 February 1956. In the broadcast, she thanked the people of Nigeria for their hospitality during her three-week tour of Nigeria. The broadcast included a special reference to the work of civil services, which she saw during her tour.	
13 October 1957	Royal Tour of Canada	On 12 October 1957, Queen Elizabeth II arrived in Ottawa for a four-day visit to open Canada's first session of the 23rd Parliament on 14 October. On 13 October 1957, the Queen made a live television address at 9 pm from her official Canadian residence to the people of Canada. It was her first ever televised broadcast and was telecast by CBC.	
26 July 1958	Closing ceremony of British Empire and Commonwealth Games	The Queen broadcast a message to the Commonwealth Games in Cardiff at its closing ceremony on 26 July 1958. The Queen, who was unable to deliver the speech in person due to catarrhal sinusitis, was represented at the ceremony by her husband, Prince Philip, Duke of Edinburgh. The Duke introduced the Queen's prerecorded message, which was prepared by the BBC. In the message, the Queen declared: "I want to take this opportunity of speaking to all Welsh people, not only in this arena but wherever they may be. The British Empire and Commonwealth Games in the capital, together with all the activities of the Festival of Wales, have made this a memorable year for the principality. I have, therefore, decided to mark it further by an act which will, I hope, give as much pleasure to all Welshmen as it does to me. I intend to create my son, Charles, Prince of Wales today. When he is grown up, I will present him to you at Caernarfon". Charles found out about this, as he and some other boys were invited to the headmaster's study at Cheam to hear the Queen's speech.	
1 July 1959	Dominion Day	From a sunny veranda at her Canadian residence at Rideau Hall in Ottawa, the Queen spoke to Canadians on Dominion Day in the midst of a long tour of Canada. In English and French, she congratulated Canadians on Dominion Day and praised the country for having attained unity. She noted that Canada was the first independent country in the Commonwealth. The Queen also said she is glad that in a country too big for her to visit everywhere, television can take her into all Canadian homes.	
1 March 1961	Farewell broadcast to India	At the end of the Royal tour of India, Queen Elizabeth II spoke to the people of India in a farewell broadcast over All India Radio, on the eve of her departure from Delhi. The Queen, the first British monarch to visit the subcontinent since independence, said that she always hoped "to have the good fortune" to come to India sooner or later, and thanked the Indian people for the warmth of their welcome. She suggested that the Royal tour had 'set the seal on a new relationship between Britain and India". The Queen said that she was happy and moved after witnessing the "splendid" Republic Day parade in Delhi, and the massive "demonstrations of affection" in Calcutta, Madras, and Bombay. She added that the events, she witnessed in India formed "a kaleidoscope of infinite colour and variety".	(Transcript)
15 March 1963	Visit to Alice Springs	On 15 March 1963, during her tour of Australia, the Queen visited Alice Springs and broadcast a message to its remote communities from the Flying Doctor base over its radio network. The Queen said she was "very sorry to learn that there has been a severe drought for the last few years, which has brought you many hardships and misfortunes". She also paid tribute to the "very special skill and unswerving devotion" of the doctors and nurses of the Royal Flying Doctor Service.	(Transcript)
26 March 1963	Farewell broadcast to Australia	The Queen, who had visited Australia to take part in Canberra's 50th jubilee, broadcast a farewell message on the eve of her departure from Australia, onboard Britannia at Fremantle to the people of Australia on 26 March 1963. In the broadcast, the Queen recounted "vitally important" milestones in Australia's history and said that they "represent progressive" steps in shaping modern-day Australia. The Queen said that "the rivalry between the States, the intense local patriotism of cities and districts is a typical sign of a healthy and vigorous democratic people". She added, "Of all the continents, Australia has the unique distinction and advantage of being one people under one Government".	(Transcript)
16 April 1970	Visit to Mount Isa	In April 1970, the Queen visited Mount Isa, as part of her royal tour of Australia. On 16 April, the Queen broadcast a speech from Mount Isa, to the outback population, over the Royal Flying Doctor Service network.	
4 March 1983	World War III	Text of a speech written in the 1980s to be used in the event of a third world war was released by the government under the thirty-year rule on government documents in 2013. The full text of the speech, written as if broadcast at midday on Friday 4 March 1983, was made available to the public by The National Archives. "The horrors of war could not have seemed more remote as my family and I shared our Christmas joy with the growing family of the Commonwealth," the speech reads in part. It mentions Prince Andrew, then serving in the Royal Navy: "My beloved son Andrew is at this moment in action with his unit and we pray continually for his safety and for the safety of all servicemen and women at home and overseas." It continues: "Now, this madness of war is once more spreading through the world and our brave country must again prepare itself to survive against great odds." The speech ends, "As we strive together to fight off the new evil, let us pray for our country and men of goodwill wherever they may be. God bless you all."	(Transcript)
24 February 1991	Gulf War	Queen Elizabeth II addressed the nation on the Gulf War. The broadcast was described by The Times as "unprecedented". The Queen spoke on her own initiative after consulting with the Prime Minister, John Major, and government ministers before making the broadcast. The Queen said that "we can unite in praying" that the success of the Allied coalition against Iraqi forces would be "as swift as it is certain" and that it be "achieved with as small a cost to human life and suffering as possible". The Queen concluded that following victory "the true reward of their courage be granted: a just and lasting peace".	
5 September 1997	Death of Diana, Princess of Wales	The Queen addressed the nation on the eve of the funeral of Diana, Princess of Wales. The Queen dressed in black wearing pearl earrings and a triangular diamond broach, and was seated in the Chinese Dining Room in Buckingham Palace in front of an open window through which the crowds outside the palace could be seen mourning the princess. The speech was written by Robert Fellowes, Baron Fellowes, the Queen's Private Secretary, with the assistance of David Airlie and Geoffrey Crawford. The Queen and Prince Philip, Duke of Edinburgh then amended the speech in consultation with staff. Andrew Rawnsley described the initial tone of the speech as being perceived by officials at 10 Downing Street as "chilly" and "impersonal". Prime Minister Tony Blair said that there were "some last minute discussions about her precise words". The Downing Street Press Secretary, Alastair Campbell, coined the phrase "speaking as a grandmother", which was approved by the Queen's Press Secretary, Dickie Arbiter, and inserted into the speech. The speech had originally been intended to be recorded at 4 pm and then later broadcast, but royal officials were persuaded by the government to broadcast the address live and it was timed to be inserted into the six o'clock news bulletins. The speech lasted for 3 minutes and 9 seconds. The circumstances of the broadcast form the "climax" of the 2006 film The Queen, in which the Queen is portrayed by Helen Mirren.	
8 April 2002	Death of the Queen Mother	The Queen addressed the nation following the death of her mother, Queen Elizabeth. In the broadcast, the Queen said that the "extent of the tributes that huge numbers of you have paid my mother in the last few days has been overwhelming" and that "I have drawn great comfort from so many individual acts of kindness and respect... So I count myself fortunate that my mother was blessed with a long and happy life. She had an infectious zest for living, and this remained with her until the very end".	
26 June 2002	Special Golden Jubilee message to Armed Forces	The Queen addressed the Armed Forces during a Golden Jubilee message broadcast worldwide on the British Forces Broadcasting Service on 26 June 2002. She spoke of the work of the servicemen and women involved in the global war against terrorism. The Queen said, "The regard in which the Armed Forces are held in the UK, and around the world, is probably as high as it has ever been over the last fifty years". She thanked the Forces for "defending Britain, and preserving peace around the world".	(Transcript)
25 December 2004	Special Christmas message to Armed Forces	It was first time in the Queen's reign that a special Christmas radio message to the Armed Forces was made by her. The message was broadcast during Christmas Day breakfast shows on the British Forces Broadcasting Service (BFBS). It was heard by British military personnel all over the world, including those in Iraq and Brunei as well as British garrisons in Germany. In it, she praised the "spirit, good humour and courage" of troops stationed across the globe in what has been a "demanding" year. The short message was recorded on the Queen's initiative as a way of expressing her thanks and support for the dangerous work being carried out by the Armed Forces.	(Transcript)
24 December 2006	Special Christmas message to Armed Forces	The Queen sent a special Christmas message to the British Armed Forces overseas. The pre-recorded message was broadcast on Christmas Eve, and it was the second time in her reign that the Queen recorded a specific message for military personnel in addition to her annual traditional broadcast to the nation. She praised the courage and loyalty of the country's soldiers serving in Iraq and Afghanistan saying, "In Iraq and Afghanistan you continue to make an enormous contribution in helping to rebuild those countries and in other operational theatres you undertake essential duties with a professionalism which is so highly regarded the world over." She said her "thoughts and prayers" were with the families of soldiers killed in recent months and, "Your courage and loyalty are not lightly taken. It is a pledge which calls for sacrifice and devotion to duty. And I know that yours is a job which often calls for great personal risk." She added, "My father, King George VI, said that 'the highest of distinctions is service to others.' There is no higher goal. Your service to our country is, I believe, an outstanding example of that ideal. I am grateful to you all".	
1 July 2009	Creation of the Elizabeth Cross	On 1 July 2009, the Queen addressed the members of the Armed Forces around the world on the British Forces Broadcasting Service. In the speech, she announced the creation of the Elizabeth Cross, a special emblem and scroll that will be presented to the next of kin of servicemen and women who have given their lives during operations. The Queen said the emblem was "a right and proper way of showing our enduring debt".	
5 June 2012	Diamond Jubilee	In 2012 to mark her Diamond Jubilee, the Queen said the public celebrations had "touched me deeply". The broadcast, lasting slightly more than two minutes, was transmitted on television and radio at 6 pm in the United Kingdom and across the Commonwealth. The message was recorded in the Presence Room in Buckingham Palace the previous evening, prior to the Jubilee Concert.	
7 June 2013	Opening of the new BBC Broadcasting House	The Queen officially opened the new BBC Broadcasting House headquarters on 7 June 2013. During her visit, she made a live broadcast to the nation on BBC Radio 4, and it was transmitted live throughout the world on the BBC World Service. In the broadcast, she said it was a "great pleasure" to see the BBC's new central London headquarters. She added, "I hope this new building will serve you well for the future and I am delighted to declare it open today." Prince Philip had also been expected to attend, but was admitted to hospital the previous day for an abdominal operation.	
1 January 2017	150th anniversary of Canadian Confederation	In a video message, the Queen, wearing the Canadian Maple Leaf brooch, sent her "warmest good wishes" of congratulations to the people of Canada on the 150th anniversary of Canadian Confederation. She spoke in both English and French, adding that she and her family are with the Canadian people "in spirit".	
5 April 2020	COVID-19 pandemic	The Queen addressed the United Kingdom and Commonwealth on the developing COVID-19 pandemic, thanking NHS doctors, nurses and frontline and other workers for carrying out their roles and assuring Britons that "We should take comfort that while we may have more still to endure, better days will return: we will be with our friends again; we will be with our families again; we will meet again".	
11 April 2020	Easter Message	The Queen delivered her first ever special Easter message on the day before Easter 2020. Though it was a televised message, the Queen did not appear in the video with only her voice being heard against the backdrop of lit candles. The Queen said, in reference to the ongoing COVID-19 pandemic, that "Easter will be different for many of us, but by keeping apart, we keep others safe". She said many religions had festivals celebrating light overcoming darkness, which often featured the lighting of candles and that candles "seem to speak to every culture, and appeal to people of all faiths, and of none". Wishing everyone of all faiths a happy Easter, she said: "May the living flame of the Easter hope be a steady guide as we face the future."	
8 May 2020	75th anniversary of VE Day	The Queen addressed the nation at 9 pm, exactly 75 years after her father, King George VI, gave a radio address on VE Day in 1945. The Queen said that at the start of the war "the outlook seemed bleak, the end distant, the outcome uncertain" but that "Never give up, never despair" was the message of VE Day. Referencing the ongoing COVID-19 pandemic, the Queen said "Our streets are not empty, they are filled with the love and the care we have for each other" and that "we are still a nation those brave soldiers, sailors and airmen would recognise and admire."	
1 November 2021	2021 United Nations Climate Change Conference	In a recorded video address, the Queen spoke of the importance of joining to tackle the challenges facing the planet as she welcomed world leaders for the UN Climate Change Conference in Glasgow. The Queen wearing a green dress and a butterfly brooch, said that "the impact of the environment on human progress was a subject close to the heart of my dear late husband, Prince Philip, the Duke of Edinburgh". The Queen expressed her hope that world leaders would “rise above the politics of the moment, and achieve true statesmanship” in tackling the climate crisis. "Of course, the benefits of such actions will not be there to enjoy for all of us here today: we none of us will live for ever. But we are doing this not for ourselves but for our children and our children's children, and those who will follow in their footsteps", she added.	

=== Charles III ===
Date	Subject	Notes	Ref
9 September 2022	Death of Elizabeth II	King Charles III addressed the Commonwealth following the death of his mother, Queen Elizabeth II. In the broadcast the King said his mother's "dedication and devotion as Sovereign never waivered, through times of change and progress, through times of joy and celebration, and through times of sadness and loss." He also emphasised his own lifelong commitment to service for "the remaining time God grants [him]". At the end of the speech, he thanked his mother for her "love and devotion to [thei]r family and to the family of nations [she] ha[s] served so diligently all these years. He ended with the Shakespearean reference: "May 'flights of Angels sing thee to thy rest'."	
10 July 2023	50th anniversary of the independence of the Bahamas	In a video message, the King of the Bahamas congratulated all Bahamians on the occasion of the 50th anniversary of the independence of the Bahamas. He recalled his visit in 1973, when he represented his mother, the Queen, at the independence celebrations. The King said, "The Bahamas has always felt like a home away from home, both in public and in private", and that "throughout the past fifty years The Bahamas has been an indispensable member of our Commonwealth family". He said that he hopes to celebrate the anniversary with Bahamians as soon as possible, and looks forward to meet some of the many Bahamians "who are already shaping the next fifty years".	
20 October 2024	50th anniversary of the Niue Constitution Act	The King of New Zealand, as Niue's head of state, sent a Constitution Day message to the people of Niue to mark Niue's 50th year of self-government and freedom of association with New Zealand.	
21 June 2025	Midwinter's Day	The King recorded a personal message for Antarctic researchers to mark the 70th anniversary of the Antarctic Midwinter Broadcast of the BBC World Service. In the message, the King praised the researchers' "critically important" work as well as their "resilience and commitment" to their jobs, which he said "embody the pioneering spirit that has characterised British polar exploration for generations". He said, "With the sun shying away from your horizon today, I particularly wanted to send my warmest good wishes to all of those serving at British Antarctic research stations this Midwinter's Day and, above all, to express the greatest admiration for the critically important work you do."	
15 August 2025	80th anniversary of VJ Day	The King honoured the service and sacrifice of those who fought in the Pacific, including forces under Lord Mountbatten and General William Slim. He remembered prisoners of war, civilians, and the immense price paid by the citizens of Hiroshima and Nagasaki. Emphasising unity across nations, faiths, and cultures, he said that the courage and camaraderie of that generation will never be forgotten, urging people to safeguard the values for which they fought.	
16 September 2025	50th anniversary of the independence of Papua New Guinea	In a video message, the King of Papua New Guinea congratulated all the peoples of the country on the occasion of the 50th anniversary of independence. He recalled his visit in 1975, when he officiated at the independence celebrations. Wearing a tie with the colours of Papua New Guinea, the King largely spoke in Tok Pisin. He reflected on the country's rich history, cultural and linguistic diversity, unique biodiversity and the resilience and the perseverance of its people. He called for unity and peace among Papua New Guineans as the country chartered its course after half a century.	
12 December 2025	Stand Up to Cancer campaign	King Charles III delivered a televised address for Channel 4's Stand Up to Cancer campaign, sharing an update on his cancer treatment. Drawing on his personal experience, he described a cancer diagnosis as "overwhelming" but stressed that early detection "quite simply saves lives". The King highlighted that around nine million people in the UK are not up to date with cancer screenings, calling this a major missed opportunity for early diagnosis. He cited survival statistics for bowel cancer to underline the issue and welcomed the new national Screening Checker. The King also announced that, due to early diagnosis and treatment, his own treatment schedule will be reduced in the new year.	
21 April 2026	100th anniversary of Elizabeth II's birth	In a message marking the centenary of the birth of Queen Elizabeth II, the King paid tribute to his mother's life of service and legacy. He described her reign as a "promise with destiny kept" and a source of constancy during change. The King highlighted her personal impact and recalled her belief that individuals can help "make the world of tomorrow a better and happier place". He urged unity in pursuing a "better, happier tomorrow" and reaffirmed his commitment to duty, concluding with a personal tribute to his "darling Mama".	
