= SS Edenhurst =

Cargo ship

History
- Name: Edenhurst (1930–37); Ilves (1937–39); Glückauf (1939–40); Warnow (1940–45); Empire Conleven (1945–46); Alexandr Parkhomenko(1946–60)
- Owner: Hartlepool Steamship Co Ltd (1930–37); Fartygs Ab Ilves Laiva Oy (1937–39); Glückauf Kohlenhandels GmbH (1939–40); Warnow Reederei GmbH (1940); Kriegsmarine (1940–45); Ministry of War Transport (1945); Ministry of Transport (1945–46); Soviet Government (1946– )
- Operator: Magee, Son & Co Ltd (1930–37); Ab John Dahlberg OY (1937–39); Glückauf Kohlenhandels GmbH (1939–40); Warnow Reederei GmbH (1940); Kriegsmarine (1940–45); Ministry of War Transport (1945); Ministry of Transport (1945–46); Sakhalin Shipping (1946–60)
- Port of registry: (United Kingdom) Wsr Hartlepool (1930–37); (Finland) Helsingfors (1937–39); (Nazi Germany) Rostock (1939–40); (Nazi Germany) Rostock (1940–45); (United Kingdom) London (1945–46); Soviet Union (1946–60)
- Builder: Furness Shipbuilding Company
- Yard number: 179
- Launched: 5 June 1930
- Completed: June 1930
- Identification: Code Letters LGDP (1930–34); Code Letters MPVQ (1934–37); Code Letters OFBV (1937–39); Code Letters GSMY (1945–46); United Kingdom Official Number 160766 (1930–37, 1945–46); Finnish Official Number 836 (1937–39)
- Fate: Deleted from shipping register in 1960

General characteristics
- Type: Cargo ship
- Tonnage: 1,596 GRT; 954 NRT
- Length: 245 ft 3 in (74.75 m)
- Beam: 39 ft 4 in (11.99 m)
- Depth: 19 ft 0 in (5.79 m)
- Installed power: Triple expansion steam engine
- Propulsion: Screw propeller

Edenhurst was a cargo ship that was built in 1930 by Furness Shipbuilding Ltd, Haverton Hill-on-Tees for British owners. She was sold in 1937 to Finnish owners and renamed Ilves. In 1939, she was sold to German owners and renamed Glückauf. In 1940 she was sold and renamed Warnow and was requisitioned by the Kriegsmarine in that year. She was seized by the Allies in Rendsburg in May 1945, passed to the Ministry of War Transport (MoWT) and renamed Empire Conleven. In 1946, she was allocated to the Soviet Government and renamed Alexandr Parkhomenko (Александр Пархоменко). The ship was deleted from Lloyd's Register in 1960.

== Description ==
The ship was built in 1930 as yard number 179 by Furness Shipbuilding Co, Haverton Hill-on-Tees.

The ship was 245 feet 3 inches (74.75 m) long, with a beam of 39 feet 4 inches (11.99 m). She had a depth of 19 feet 0 inches (5.79 m). The ship had a GRT of 1,596 and a NRT of 934. Her DWT was 2,743.

The ship was propelled by a triple expansion steam engine, which had cylinders of 18 inches (46 cm), 30 inches (76 cm) and 50 inches (130 cm) diameter by 33 inches (84 cm) stroke. The engine was built by Blair & Co 91926) Ltd, Stockton on Tees.

== History ==
Edenhurst was built for Hartlepool Steamship Co Ltd, Hartlepool. Her port of registry was West Hartlepool. The Code Letters LGDP and United Kingdom Official Number 160766 were allocated. She was placed under the management of Magee, Son & Co Ltd, West Hartlepool. On 21 January 1932, Edenhurst was in collision with the Dutch motor vessel Catharina in the River Thames at Greenwich. In 1934, her Code letters were changed to MPVQ.

In 1937, Edenhurst was sold to Fartygs AB Ilves Laiva OY, Finland and was renamed Ilves. She was placed under the management of AB John Dahlberg. Her port of registry was changed to Helsingfors and the Code Letters OFBY were allocated. Ilves was allocated the Finnish Official Number 836. In 1939, Ilves was sold to Glückauf Kohlenhandels GmbH, Rostock and was renamed Glückauf. Her port of registry was changed to Rostock and the Code Letters DMDR were allocated.

In 1940, Glückauf was sold to Warnow Reederei GmbH, Rostock and was renamed Warnow. In 1940, she was requisitioned by the Kriegsmarine. Warnow was seized by the Allies in May 1945 at Rendsburg. She was passed to the MoWT and renamed Empire Conleven. Her port of registry was changed to London and the Code Letters GSNF were allocated. The ship regained her Official Number of 160766.

In 1946, Empire Conleven was allocated to the Soviet Government and was renamed Alexandr Parkhomenko.

=== Soviet Union period of the ship. ===
According to the reparation programm-agreement, the ship was transferred to the Soviet Union in March 1946. The name of the ship was changed to Alexandr Parkhomenko (Russian: Александр Пархоменко) and the ship sailed from Methyl port (Scotland) to Kaliningrad on 26 March 1946. The crew was a team for ship's transfer during this voyage. By decision of the USSR Council of Ministers the steamer was destined for the newly formed Sakhalin State Shipping Company. After bunker supply the ship sailed from Kaliningrad to Nikolayev, Black Sea, in April 1946. The ship had to visit Nikolayev for repair. The ship Александр Пархоменко passed the Kiel on 15 April, visited Gibraltar on 24 and 25 April and passed Istanbul (Bosphorus) on 6 May 1946. After permanent repair in Nikolayev and Odessa the steamer sailed to Vladivostok at the end of July 1946. The ship was operated by the Sakhalin State Shipping Company until 1959, and then removed from the register.

The ship was deleted from Lloyds Register in 1960.
