= Edenhurst =

Edenhurst may refer to

== Places ==
- Edenhurst, Ontario, Canada

== Ships ==
- SS Edenhurst a British cargo ship in service 1930-37
