= Wave-class oiler =

Class of twenty replenishment oilers of the Royal Fleet Auxiliary

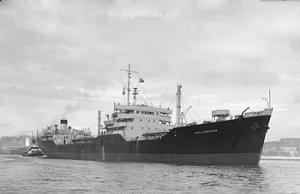
- RFA Wave Conqueror, pictured in 1952

Class overview
- Name: Wave class
- Builders: Furness Shipbuilding Company, Haverton Hill-on-Tees; Harland & Wolff, Govan; Sir J. Laing & Sons Ltd, Sunderland
- Operators: Ministry of War Transport; Royal Fleet Auxiliary
- Preceded by: Ranger class
- Succeeded by: Surf class
- Built: 1943–1946
- In commission: 1944–1974
- Completed: 20

General characteristics
- Type: Replenishment oiler
- Displacement: 16,476 long tons (16,740 t) to 16,483 long tons (16,748 t)
- Length: 465 ft (142 m) (p/p); 492 ft (150 m) (o/a)
- Beam: 64 ft 4 in (19.61 m)
- Draught: 28 ft 6 in (8.69 m)
- Propulsion: Parsons double reduction geared turbines; 3 drum type boilers
- Speed: 15 knots (17 mph; 28 km/h)
- Capacity: 11,900 long tons (12,091 t)

The Wave class was a class of twenty replenishment oilers built for service supporting the Royal Navy (RN) during the later years of the Second World War. They were subsequently transferred to the Royal Fleet Auxiliary (RFA), the naval auxiliary fleet of the United Kingdom, after the end of the war, and went on to support British and allied fleet units in Cold War conflicts such as the Korean War.

== Design and construction ==
The expanding needs of the Royal Navy to carry out long range operations away from friendly fueling and replenishment stations led to the ordering of a number of tankers of around 16,500 long tons (16,765 t) displacement, able to carry 11,900 long tons (12,091 t) of fuel oil. These would allow the Royal Navy and its allies increased flexibility, particularly in the Pacific theatre, where there were large expanses of water and few friendly fuel stations. A total of twenty ships were eventually built by three British yards; 12 by the Furness Shipbuilding Company, Haverton Hill-on-Tees, three by Harland & Wolff at their yard in Govan, and the remaining five by Sir J. Laing & Sons Ltd, at Sunderland.

== Service ==
Thirteen of the 20 of the ships were initially built for the Ministry of War Transport (MoWT), which assigned them to be operated by various merchant shipping lines. Consequently, most were named with the standard MoWT prefix "Empire". The remaining MoWT owned oilers were transferred to the Royal Fleet Auxiliary in 1946 and all were given "Wave" names. Several of the RFA ships served in the Far East during the Second World War, while the class was heavily involved in the Korean War. RFAs Wave Sovereign, Wave Baron, Wave Premier, Wave Prince, Wave Chief, Wave Knight, Wave Regent, Wave Laird and Wave Conqueror all served there in support of allied fleet units and task forces.

The class began to be retired from the Royal Fleet Auxiliary in the late 1950s, with Wave Commander and Wave Liberator the first to be sold for scrapping in 1959. Most of the remaining vessels had been scrapped by the mid-1960s, but refits and modifications allowed several to continue in service until the mid-1970s, with Wave Chief the last to be retired, in 1974.

== Ships ==
Name	Pennant	Builder	Launched	Original name	Fate
Wave Baron	A242	Furness Shipbuilding Company, Haverton Hill-on-Tees	19 February 1946	Empire Flodden	Scrapped in 1972
Wave Chief	A265	Harland & Wolff, Govan	30 August 1946	Empire Edgehill	Scrapped in 1974
Wave Commander	A244	Furness Shipbuilding Company, Haverton Hill-on-Tees	21 April 1944	Empire Paladin	Scrapped in 1959
Wave Conqueror	A245	Furness Shipbuilding Company, Haverton Hill-on-Tees	27 November 1943	Empire Law	Scrapped in 1960
Wave Duke	A246	Sir J. Laing & Sons Ltd, Sunderland	16 November 1944	Empire Mars	Scrapped in 1969
Wave Emperor	A100	Furness Shipbuilding Company, Haverton-Hill-on-Tees	16 October 1944		Scrapped in 1966
Wave Governor	A247	Furness Shipbuilding Company, Haverton-Hill-on-Tees	30 November 1944		Scrapped in 1960
Wave King	A182	Harland and Wolff, Govan	21 July 1944		Scrapped in 1966
Wave Knight	A249	Sir J. Laing & Sons Ltd, Sunderland	22 October 1945	Empire Naseby	Scrapped in 1964
Wave Laird	A119	Sir J. Laing & Sons Ltd, Sunderland	3 April 1946	Empire Dunbar	Scrapped in 1970
Wave Liberator	A248	Furness Shipbuilding Company, Haverton Hill-on-Tees	9 February 1944	Empire Milner	Scrapped in 1959
Wave Master	A193	Sir J. Laing & Sons Ltd, Sunderland	20 May 1944	Empire Salisbury	Scrapped in 1963
Wave Monarch	A264	Harland and Wolff, Govan	6 July 1944		Sold as oil hulk in 1960
Wave Premier	A129	Furness Shipbuilding Company, Haverton Hill-on-Tees	27 June 1946		Scrapped in 1960
Wave Prince	A207	Sir J. Laing & Sons Ltd, Sunderland	27 July 1945	Empire Herald	Scrapped in 1971
Wave Protector	A215	Furness Shipbuilding Company, Haverton Hill-on-Tees	20 July 1944	Empire Protector	March 1958 (hulked at Malta); Broken up in 1963.
Wave Regent	A210	Furness Shipbuilding Company, Haverton Hill-on-Tees	29 March 1945		Scrapped in 1960
Wave Ruler	A212	Furness Shipbuilding Company, Haverton Hill-on-Tees	17 January 1946	Empire Evesham	Scrapped in 1977
Wave Sovereign	A211	Furness Shipbuilding Company, Haverton Hill-on-Tees	20 November 1945		January 1966 (withdrawn in Singapore); Scrapped in May 1967
Wave Victor	A220	Furness Shipbuilding Company, Haverton Hill-on-Tees	30 September 1943	Empire Bounty	1971, having spent part of the 1960s as a Fuel Hulk at RAF Gan

== See also ==
- List of replenishment ships of the Royal Fleet Auxiliary
