= RFA Wave Sovereign =

1946 Wave-class oiler of the Royal Fleet Auxiliary

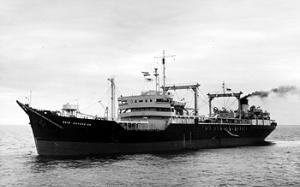

History

United Kingdom
- Name: RFA Wave Sovereign
- Ordered: 29 May 1943
- Builder: Furness Shipbuilding Company, Haverton Hill-on-Tees
- Laid down: 10 May 1944
- Launched: 20 November 1945
- Commissioned: 28 February 1946
- Decommissioned: 1966
- Fate: Scrapped in May 1967

General characteristics
- Tonnage: 8,187 gross register tons (GRT)
- Displacement: 16,483 tons full load
- Length: 492 ft 8 in (150.16 m)
- Beam: 64 ft 4 in (19.61 m)
- Draught: 28 ft 6 in (8.69 m)
- Propulsion: Parsons double reduction geared turbines,3 drum type boilers, 6,800 hp (5,100 kW).
- Speed: 14.5 knots (26.9 km/h)

RFA Wave Sovereign (A211) was a Wave-class fleet support tanker of the Royal Fleet Auxiliary and was built at Haverton Hill by the Furness Shipbuilding Company.

On 8 December 1948, Wave Sovereign was in collision with the destroyer Corunna while refuelling Corunna. She was extensively modified in the early 1960s.

She was decommissioned in 1966 and laid up at Singapore. Wave Sovereign was scrapped there in May 1967.

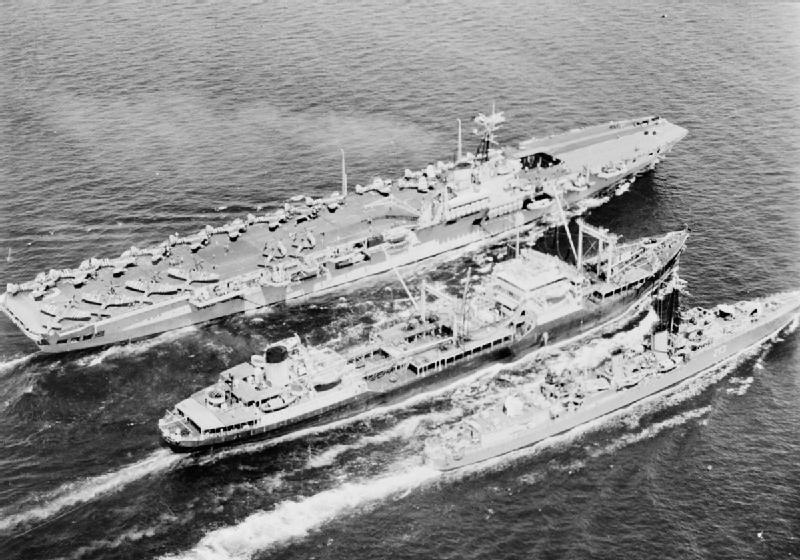
Wave Sovereign replenishing HMS Ocean and HMCS Nootka off Korea, 1952.
