= RFA Wave Chief =

1946 Wave-class oiler of the Royal Fleet Auxiliary

- RFA Wave Chief (A265)

History

United Kingdom
- Name: Empire Edgehill (1946); Wave Chief (1946-75)
- Owner: Ministry of Transport (1946); Admiralty (1946–74); Thos. W. Ward (1974–75)
- Operator: Royal Fleet Auxiliary (1946-74)
- Builder: Harland & Wolff, Govan
- Yard number: 1306
- Launched: 4 April 1946
- Commissioned: 30 July 1946
- Decommissioned: August 1974
- Identification: United Kingdom Official Number 180935; Pennant number: X119 (1946– ), A265 ( –1974)
- Honours and awards: Korea, 1951–53
- Fate: Scrapped 1975

General characteristics
- Tonnage: 8,187 gross register tons (GRT)
- Displacement: 16,483 tons full load
- Length: 492 ft 8 in (150.16 m)
- Beam: 64 ft 4 in (19.61 m)
- Draught: 28 ft 6 in (8.69 m)
- Propulsion: 2 x Metrovick double reduction geared steam turbines, 6,800 hp (5,100 kW).
- Speed: 14.5 knots (26.9 km/h)

RFA Wave Chief was a Wave-class fleet support tanker of the Royal Fleet Auxiliary that was built in 1946 as SS Empire Edgehil by Harland & Wolff, Govan, Glasgow, United Kingdom.

She saw service during the Korean War, earning a battle star. Wave Chief also served in the First Cod War and Second Cod War against Iceland. She was extensively modified in the early 1960s and escorted Sir Alec Rose around Cape Horn, South America in April 1968. She was decommissioned and laid up at Rosyth, Fife, in August 1974, and arrived at Inverkeithing, Fife, for scrapping on 13 November 1974.

== Description ==
The ship was built by Harland & Wolff, Govan, Glasgow. She was yard number 1306.

The ship was 492 feet 8 inches (150.16 m) long, with a beam of 64 feet 4 inches (19.61 m). She had a draught of 28 feet 6 inches (8.69 m). She was assessed at 8,187 GRT.

The ship was propelled by two steam turbines, double reduction geared, driving a single screw propeller. The turbines were made by Metrovick, Manchester, Lancashire. They could propel her at 14.5 knots (26.9 km/h).

== History ==
Empire Edgehill was launched on 4 April 1946. On 27 July 1946, she was transferred to the Admiralty and three days later she was completed as Wave Chief, allocated the United Kingdom Official Number 180935 and the pennant number X119.

Wave Chief was initially chartered out before she was taken over by the Royal Fleet Auxiliary. She was operating in the Mediterranean in 1947, when one of her firemen was discharged dead at Suez, Egypt. In 1949, she loaded a cargo at Abadan, Iran and delivered it to Sydney, Australia. On 25 June 1950, Wave Chief joined the United States Seventh Fleet for naval operations. On 18 November 1951, Wave Chief was refuelling HMAS Sydney off the coast of Korea when there was an accident which resulted in a large spill of fuel and damage to her rig.

On 27 July 1953, Wave Chief was awarded a battle honour for her service during the Korean War. During December 1956 and January 1957, Wave Chief accompanied HMY Britannia during the Duke of Edinburgh's tour of the southern oceans. From 1957, she took part in Operation Grapple X, the British hydrogen bomb tests at Christmas Island. On 13 November 1957, she ran aground at Batu Puteh, Singapore, holing all but four of her eighteen tanks.

From November 1958, Wave Chief was deployed supporting Royal Navy ships in operations off Iceland in the First Cod War. These deployments continued until February 1961. In 1961, Wave Chief came to the assistance of the Haisboro Light Vessel which was sinking off the Norfolk coast after being in collision with another ship. From September to December 1965, Wave Chief accompanied HMS London, HMS Lynx, HMS Odin HMS Penelope and HMS Tiger on a goodwill tour of South America. The squadron, under the command of Vice-Admiral Sir Fitzroy Talbot, visited ports in Argentina, Brazil, Chile, Dominican Republic, Ecuador, Peru and Venezuela.

On 12 December 1967, Wave Chief was severely damaged in a storm in the Mediterranean. Repairs were carried out at Gibraltar. On 25 April 1968, Wave Chief departed from Punta Arenas, Chile to rendezvous with the yacht Lively Lady, which was being sailed single-handedly around the world by Alec Rose. She escorted Lively Lady around Cape Horn, South America on 1 April. From 15 to 17 March 1973, Wave Chief assisted Icelandic Coast Guard, Royal Air Force and Royal Navy units in the unsuccessful search for survivors from the trawler Sjoestjaman.

From May to August 1973, Wave Chief operated in support of Royal Navy units involved in the Second Cod War. She was decommissioned in August 1974 and laid up at Rosyth, Dunbartonshire. In September she was listed for disposal. Wave Chief was purchased for £208,825 to Thos. W. Ward. She arrived at Inverkeithing, Fife on 13 November 1974 for scrapping, which took place in 1975.
