= RFA Wave Prince =

1947 Wave-class oiler of the Royal Fleet Auxiliary

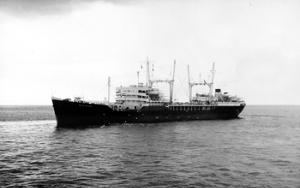

History

United Kingdom
- Name: SS Empire Herald (1945-47); RFA Wave Prince (1947-71)
- Builder: Sir J Laing & Sons Ltd, Sunderland
- Laid down: 1945
- Launched: 27 July 1945
- Commissioned: 12 February 1947
- Decommissioned: August 1965
- Fate: Scrapped in 1971

General characteristics
- Tonnage: 8,187 gross register tons (GRT)
- Displacement: 16,483 tons full load
- Length: 492 ft 8 in (150.16 m)
- Beam: 64 ft 4 in (19.61 m)
- Draught: 28 ft 6 in (8.69 m)
- Propulsion: Parsons double reduction geared turbines,3 drum type boilers, 6,800 hp (5,100 kW).
- Speed: 14.5 knots (26.9 km/h)

RFA Wave Prince (A207) was a Wave-class fleet support tanker of the Royal Fleet Auxiliary. She was built by Sir J. Laing & Sons Ltd at Sunderland and was employed as an underway replenishment oiler. During 1961-1962 she was modified extensively, laid up at Devonport in August 1965 and arrived in Burriana, Spain for scrapping on 16 December 1971.
