= RFA Wave Master =

1946 Wave-class oiler of the Royal Fleet Auxiliary

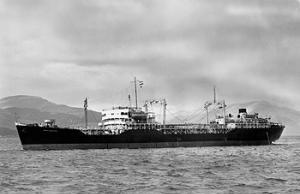

History

United Kingdom
- Name: SS Empire Salisbury (1944-46); RFA Wave Master (1946-63)
- Builder: Sir J. Laing & Sons Ltd, Sunderland
- Laid down: 1943
- Launched: 20 May 1944
- Commissioned: December 1946
- Decommissioned: 23 September 1962
- Fate: Scrapped in May 1963

General characteristics
- Tonnage: 8,187 gross register tons (GRT)
- Displacement: 16,483 tons full load
- Length: 492 ft 8 in (150.16 m)
- Beam: 64 ft 4 in (19.61 m)
- Draught: 28 ft 6 in (8.69 m)
- Propulsion: Parsons double reduction geared turbines,3 drum type boilers, 6,800 hp (5,100 kW).
- Speed: 14.5 knots (26.9 km/h)

RFA Wave Master (A193) was a Wave-class fleet support tanker of the Royal Fleet Auxiliary.

She was built as Empire Salisbury by Sir J. Laing & Sons Ltd, and transferred to the Royal Fleet Auxiliary in 1946. She was laid up at Singapore on 23 September 1962, and scrapped at Jurong in May 1963.
