= SS Gothic (1947) =

British passenger-cargo liner

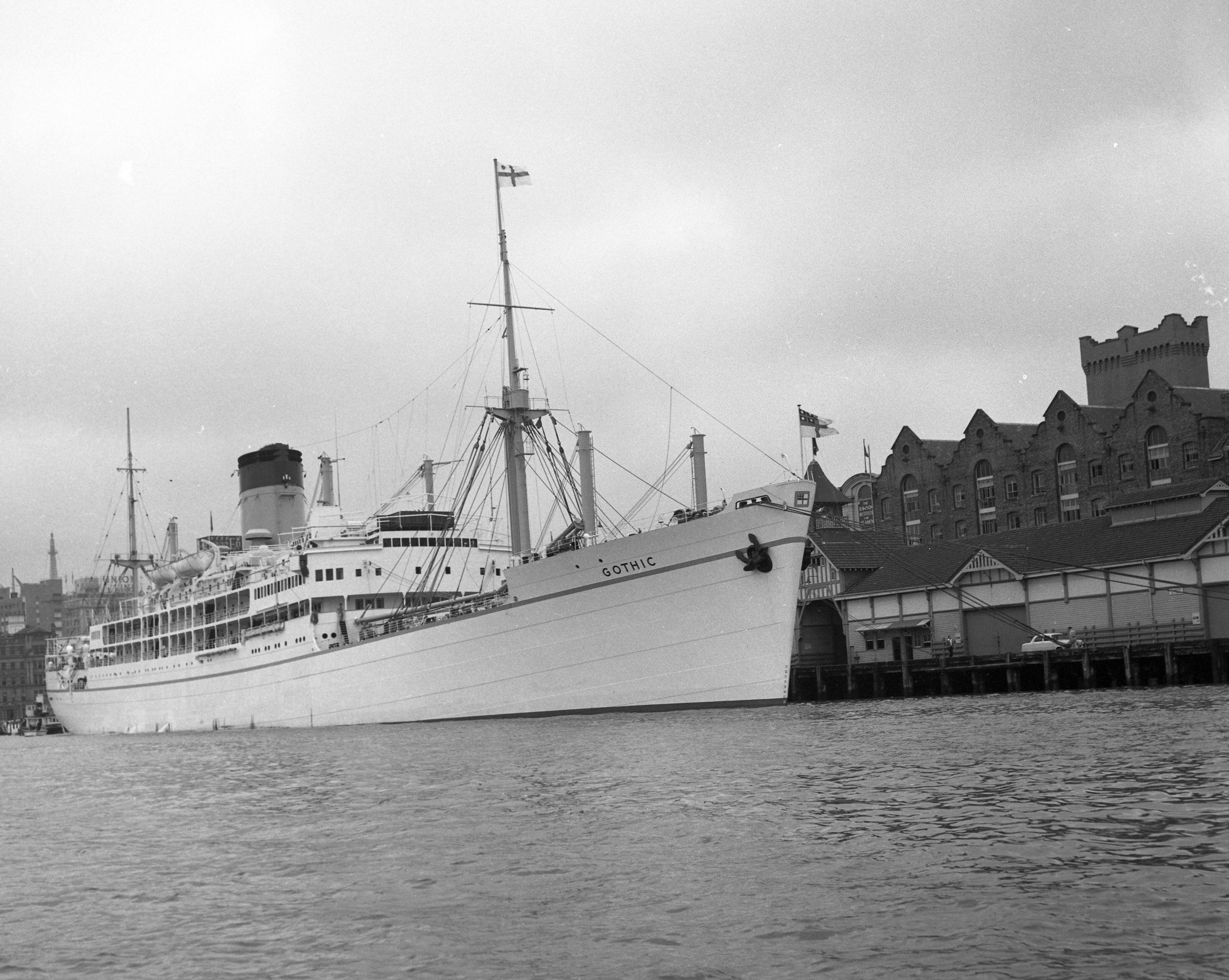

History

United Kingdom
- Name: SS Gothic
- Owner: Shaw, Savill & Albion Steamship Co.
- Builder: Swan Hunter
- Yard number: 1759
- Launched: 12 December 1947
- Completed: December 1948
- Maiden voyage: 23 December 1948
- Identification: Call sign: MAUQ; IMO number: 5134088
- Fate: Arrived at Kaohsiung, Taiwan for scrapping, 13 August 1969

General characteristics
- Type: Passenger-cargo liner
- Tonnage: 15,902
- Length: 561 ft (171 m)
- Beam: 72.2 ft (22.0 m)
- Draft: 29.7 ft (9.1 m)
- Decks: 4
- Installed power: Geared steam turbines 14,000 shp (10,000 kW)
- Propulsion: Twin screws
- Speed: 17 knots (31 km/h; 20 mph)
- Crew: 95

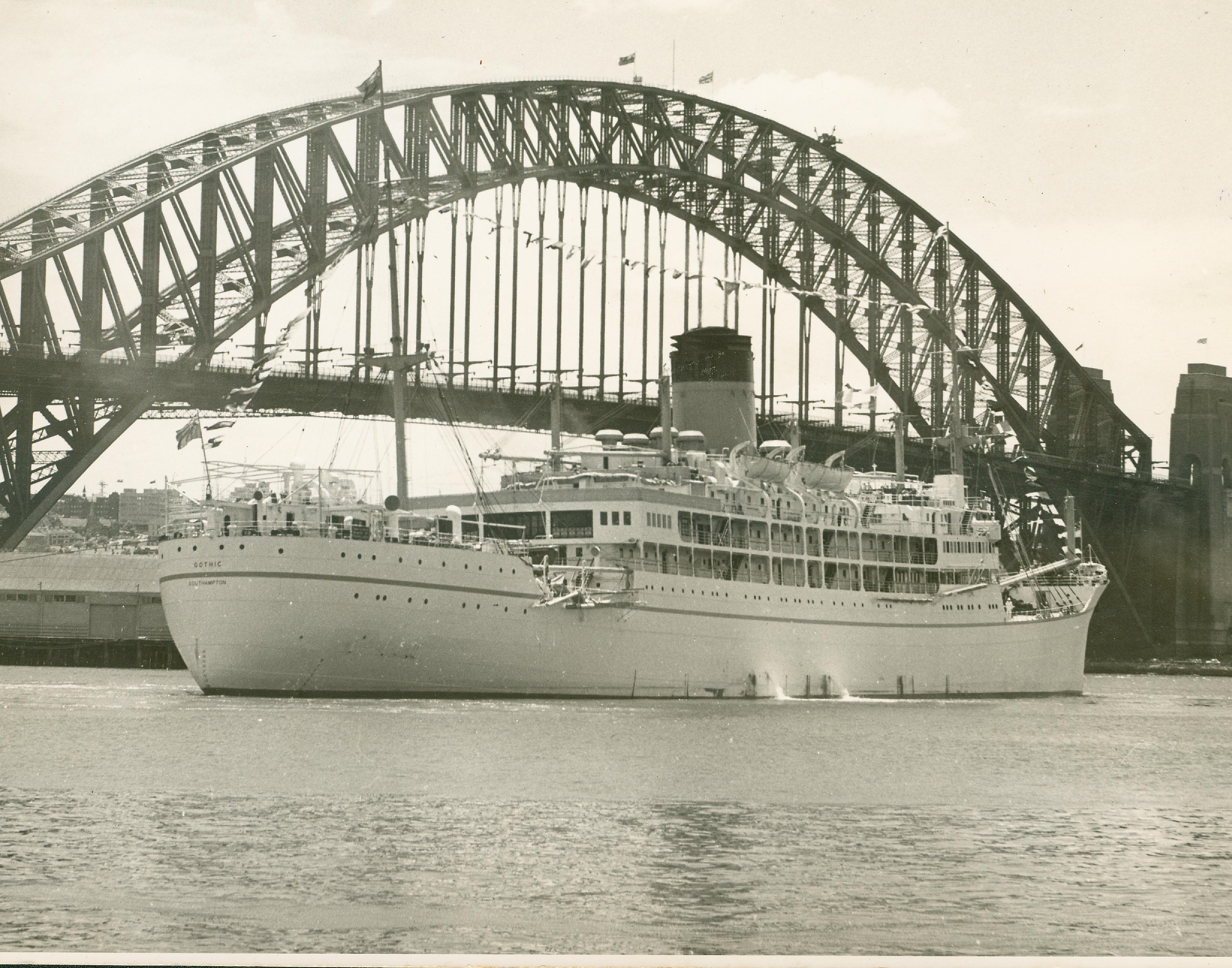
Gothic, 1954

SS Gothic was a passenger-cargo liner launched in December 1947, though not completed until a year later. She became famous when she was designated a royal yacht from 1952 to 1954.

== Construction and commercial service ==
Gothic was built by Swan Hunter, Wallsend-on-Tyne, England (yard 1759), the fourth and final of the Corinthic-class liners ordered by the Shaw, Savill & Albion Line in 1946. Her sister ships were Corinthic, Athenic and Ceramic. She was launched on 12 December 1947, completed in December 1948, and departed on her maiden voyage on 23 December 1948, sailing from Liverpool to Sydney.

The quartet joined the much larger QSMV Dominion Monarch on the UK to New Zealand service. Each ship was around 15,000 GRT and accommodated 85 first class passengers. Each had 6 large holds, with space for 668,000 cubic feet (18,900 m^{3}) of cargo, of which 510,000 cubic feet (14,000 m^{3}) was for refrigerated goods.

In 1969 she was sold to China Steel Corp and arrived at Kaohsiung for demolition on 13 August that year.

== Royal yacht ==
In 1952, Gothic was sent to Cammell Laird shipyards to be refitted to become the royal yacht for a tour of Australia and New Zealand. Although the tour was cancelled due to the death of King George VI, considerable work had already been completed and she returned in 1953 to complete the refit, which included a white-painted hull. In 1954 the Queen's visit to Australia occurred and Gothic was used for the visit. The Australian Government film The Queen in Australia 1954 featured the ship in Sydney on arrival and in Fremantle on departure three months later. This visit was part of Queen Elizabeth II's world tour of the Commonwealth in 1953-1954.
