= Furness Shipbuilding Company =

Former shipbuilding company in Stockton on Tees, England

- Company type: Private
- Industry: Shipbuilding
- Founded: 13 October 1917
- Defunct: 27 June 2023
- Fate: Closed
- Headquarters: Haverton Hill, Stockton on Tees

The Furness Shipbuilding Company was a shipbuilding company in Haverton Hill, Stockton on Tees, England. It was established during the First World War and operated from 1917 until 1979. The company was dissolved multiple times since but these were declared void until its final dissolution in 2023.

== Establishment ==
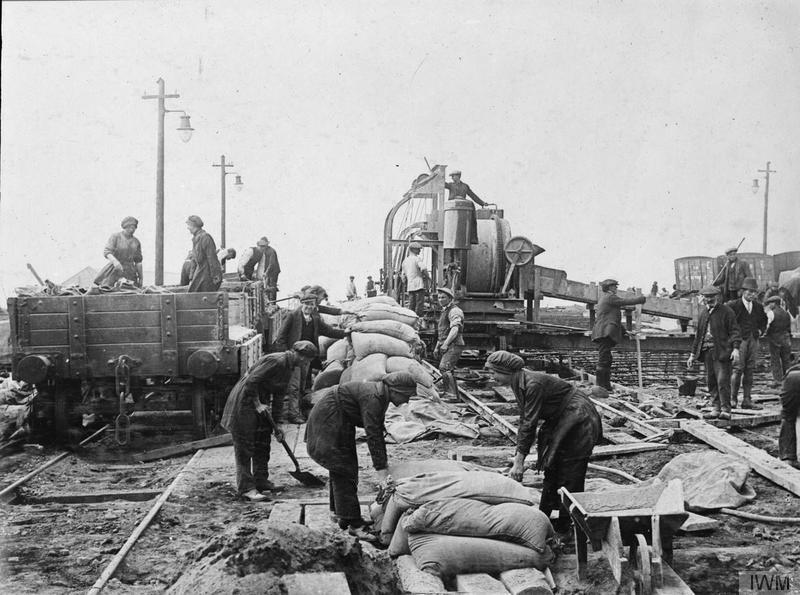
Construction of new berths during the First World War

The yard was initially established as an emergency shipyard to repair ships damaged in the war. It was incorporated as a private company in 1917 and covered an 85-acre site on the north bank of the River Tees at Haverton Hill, opposite Middlesbrough. As completed it included 50 acres reclaimed from tidal land with 2,500 feet of river frontage, with twelve building berths and a fitting-out basin measuring 1,000 feet by 250 feet. It operated as a subsidiary within the Furness, Withy Shipping Company, with the first ship being laid down in March 1918, before the yard had been completed. It initially built ships for the British Government and foreign companies as well as ships for Furness, Withy & Co and its subsidiaries. During the 1920s it built colliers, tramp steamers, twin-funnelled passenger/cargo liners, whaling ships and five deep-sea tankers. In the late 1920s it built a number of ships for service on the Great Lakes of North America, transporting grain and gypsum rock. These vessels were of the bridge-forward/engines-aft design typical of the lake freighters. One such ship built by the Furness Shipbuilding Company was the Cementkarrier, one of the first diesel-electric ships built in the North East of England.

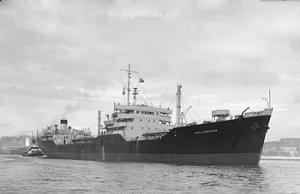
RFA Wave Conqueror, a Wave-class oiler of the Royal Fleet Auxiliary, launched from the shipyard in 1943

With the economic decline of the 1930s affecting shipping and shipbuilding companies, the yard had few orders during the early 1930s. Business improved during the mid-1930s and in 1936 the yard produced 11 ships. During the Second World War, between 1939 and 1946, 26 deep-sea tankers, sixteen coastal CHANT tankers, six tramp ships and three whale factory ships were built. To cope with wartime demand the yard added four extra berths. The postwar years also saw significant orders from the yard, with 76 large ships and tankers built between 1947 and 1963. In around 1951 ownership of the yard was vested in Haverton Holdings. In 1954, J. Sears & Co. bought Haverton Holdings for £3.5 million. By 1961 the yard employed 2,750 workers and was producing ships of to 52,000 tons deadweight tonnage and steelwork for bridges and gasholders.

== Decline ==
The yard was modernised in 1963 to be able to build supertankers and bulk carriers, building its first bulk carrier, Essi Gina, shortly afterwards. A slump in orders followed and in 1967 Sears sold off its shipbuilding interests. In March 1968 it was announced that the yard was to be closed with the loss of 3,000 jobs. In October 1968 the yard was sold to the Swan Hunter group for £2.5 million. Further orders were placed and on 12 October 1970 the yard launched the first of six Bridge-class ore/bulk/oil carriers, Furness Bridge. Five others were launched at the rate of one per year. In 1977 the yard and the other Swan Hunter assets were nationalised into the British Shipbuilders Corporation and two years later, in 1979, the yard was finally closed.

== Legacy ==
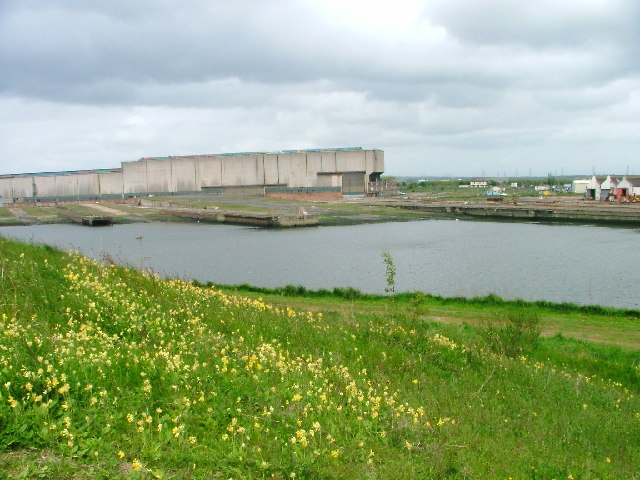
The derelict slipways of the Furness Shipbuilding Company in 2005

The site of the yard passed into the ownership of the Tees Alliance Group, which acquired it to build offshore structures for the oil industry. With the bankruptcy of the company in 2014, its assets, including the shipyard site, were acquired by the Dano-German venture Offshore Structures (Britain) Ltd.
