= Haverton Hill =

Coordinates: 54.598°N 1.251°W

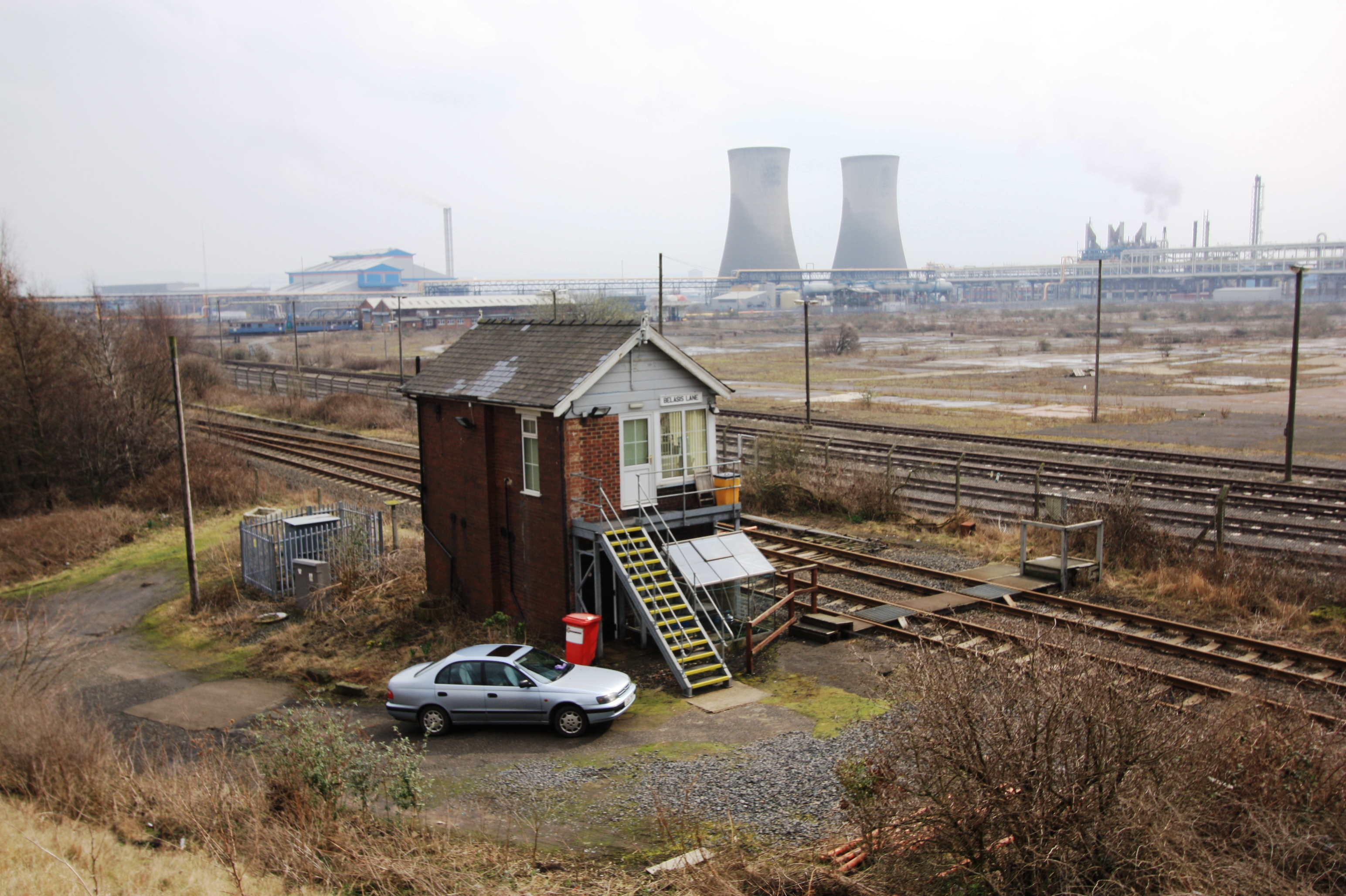
- Belasis Lane

- Location within County Durham
- OS grid reference: NZ485227
- Unitary authority: Stockton-on-Tees
- Ceremonial county: County Durham
- Region: North East
- Country: England
- Sovereign state: United Kingdom
- Post town: BILLINGHAM
- Postcode district: TS23
- Police: Cleveland
- Fire: Cleveland
- Ambulance: North East

Haverton Hill is an area within the borough of Stockton-on-Tees and ceremonial county of County Durham, England. Once considered a part of Billingham, Haverton Hill was once a thriving industrial community which has suffered significant depopulation since the 1960s as a result of pollution.

It is situated to the north of the River Tees, near Billingham. The A1046 is the main road linking to Stockton and the A19 in the west and Port Clarence and the A178 in the east.

== History ==
In 1828 Haverton Hill was a small hamlet. The settlement along with adjoining, Port Clarence, grew as a result of the Clarence Railway opening in 1833. The railway, owned by Christopher Tennant, was a rival to the Stockton and Darlington Railway and transported coal from the Durham coalfields to colliers for shipment to places like London. Haverton Hill and Port Clarence were chosen as termini as the river at that stretch was deep enough to accommodate ships. Further upstream near Stockton-on-Tees, navigation was extremely difficult due to shallow waters. Directly opposite, on the other side of the River Tees, the Stockton and Darlington Railway was, for the same reason, extended, in 1830, to Middlesbrough .

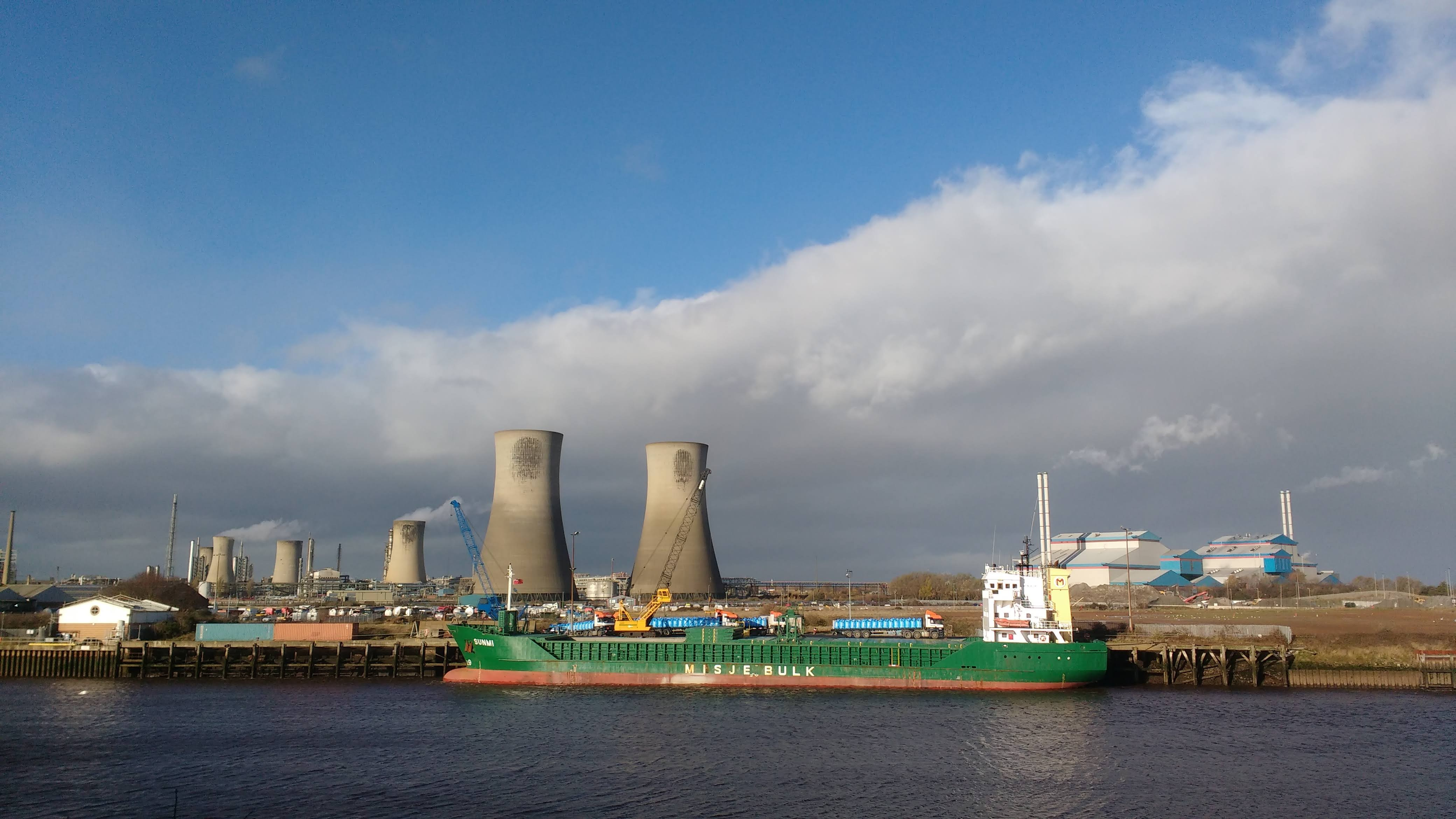
Haverton Hill viewed from Middlesbrough.

The Clarence railway used track belonging to the Stockton and Darlington Railway, between Shildon and the coal mines. Rivalry between the two railway companies hindered the prosperity of the Clarence Railway, despite its shorter distance to the coalfields, and prevented Haverton Hill and Port Clarence from growing as quickly as Middlesbrough.

Between 1833 and 1850 small scale industries such as an iron works followed by glass works sprang up in Haverton Hill, making use of the improved transportation.

In 1850, iron was discovered in Eston Hills, south of the River Tees, which was a further stimulus to the area, especially Middlesbrough, which already had many iron foundries built by John Vaughan and Henry Bolckow.

In 1860 Haverton Hill became a parish.

In 1861 Vaughan and Bolckow discovered salt deposits near Middlesbrough, but it was deemed not economically viable to extract. This prompted John Bell, in 1874, to drill north of the river where he discovered a vast salt bed at Saltholme Farm, near to Haverton Hill. Improved techniques for salt extraction were developed in 1882 which led to salt exploitation by Bell Brothers and other companies. This new industry led to further growth of Haverton Hill and neighbouring settlements with the salt industry building housing for its workers.

Haverton Hill Road opening ceremony was held on October 15th1905.

Casebourne's established a cement works on the Tees bank in 1904. A further stimulus for Haverton Hill's growth took place in 1917 when the Furness shipyard (Haverton Hill shipyard) was authorised to be built in order to replace ships sunk by German U-boats in the First World War. The first ship was launched in 1919, named 'War Energy'. A model village or garden city was built to accommodate 500 men as skilled labour for the shipyard.

In 1920 the Brunner Mond company, already having a salt extraction industry in the locality, diversified into producing fertiliser by setting up the company, Synthetic Ammonia and Nitrates Ltd. Brunner Mond in 1926 amalgamated with three other companies to form the Imperial Chemical Industries.

ICI rapidly expanded its presence in the area over the next few decades, and in 1928 took over the Casebourne's cement works, which used byproducts from the fertiliser plant as a raw material.

Atmospheric pollution, primarily from a Boiler and Sulphuric Acid Plant built by I.C.I. became a major concern after the Second World War. This led to the total demolition of the residential houses in Haverton Hill during the 1960s and 1970s with the bulk of its population being moved to nearby Billingham.

== Today ==
Today, a light industrial estate occupies the site of Haverton Hill. The nearby I.C.I. plants responsible for most of the pollution have now been demolished. Haverton Hill is in the Stockton North parliamentary constituency. Haverton Hill is hard to access without a motor vehicle but there is an infrequent bus service run by the Stagecoach Group which travels through Haverton Hill Road. Both the number 1 and 34 bus services are on the Haverton Hill route. There are also cycle paths on each side of Haverton Hill Road.
