= USCGC Mackinaw (WAGB-83) =

Former Coast Guard icebreaker, now a museum ship

Coordinates: 45°46′46.90″N 84°43′11.55″W

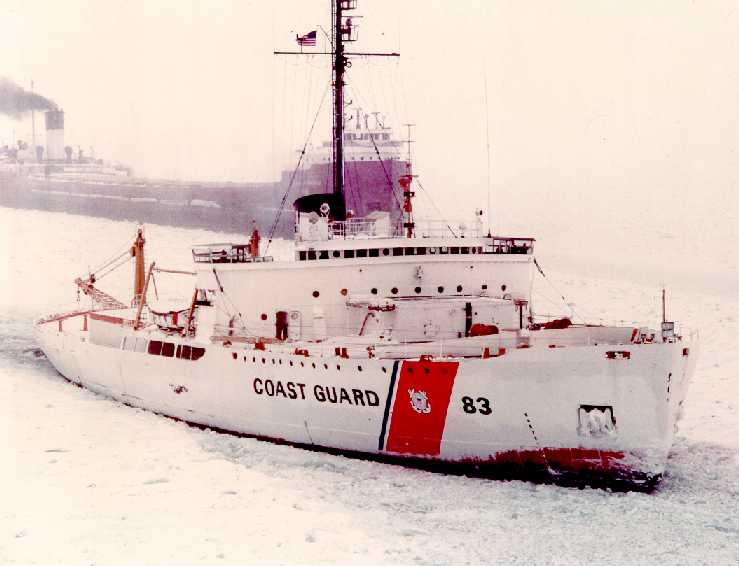
- USCGC Mackinaw

History

United States
- Name: USCGC Mackinaw
- Namesake: Mackinaw City, Michigan
- Ordered: December 17, 1941
- Builder: Toledo Shipbuilding Company, American Ship Building Company
- Laid down: March 20, 1943
- Launched: March 4, 1944
- Commissioned: December 20, 1944
- Decommissioned: June 10, 2006
- Identification: IMO number: 8640210; MMSI number: 367557380; Callsign: NRKP
- Status: Museum ship

General characteristics
- Displacement: 5,252 long tons (5,336 t)
- Length: 290 ft (88 m)
- Beam: 74.3 ft (22.6 m)
- Draft: 19.5 ft (5.9 m)
- Propulsion: 6 × Fairbanks-Morse 10-cylinder Diesel engines, total 10,000 shp (7,500 kW); Three propellers
- Speed: 15 kn (28 km/h; 17 mph)
- Capacity: Diesel fuel: 276,000 U.S. gal (1,040,000 L); Lubrication oil: 7,000 U.S. gal (26,000 L); Potable water: 40,200 U.S. gal (152,000 L); Ballast water: 121,631 U.S. gal (460,420 L); Heel and trim ballast water: 345,828 U.S. gal (1,309,100 L)
- Complement: 10 officers, 2 warrants, 132 enlisted (1945); 11 officers, 2 warrants, 122 enlisted (1965); 11 officers, 2 warrants, 64 enlisted (2005)

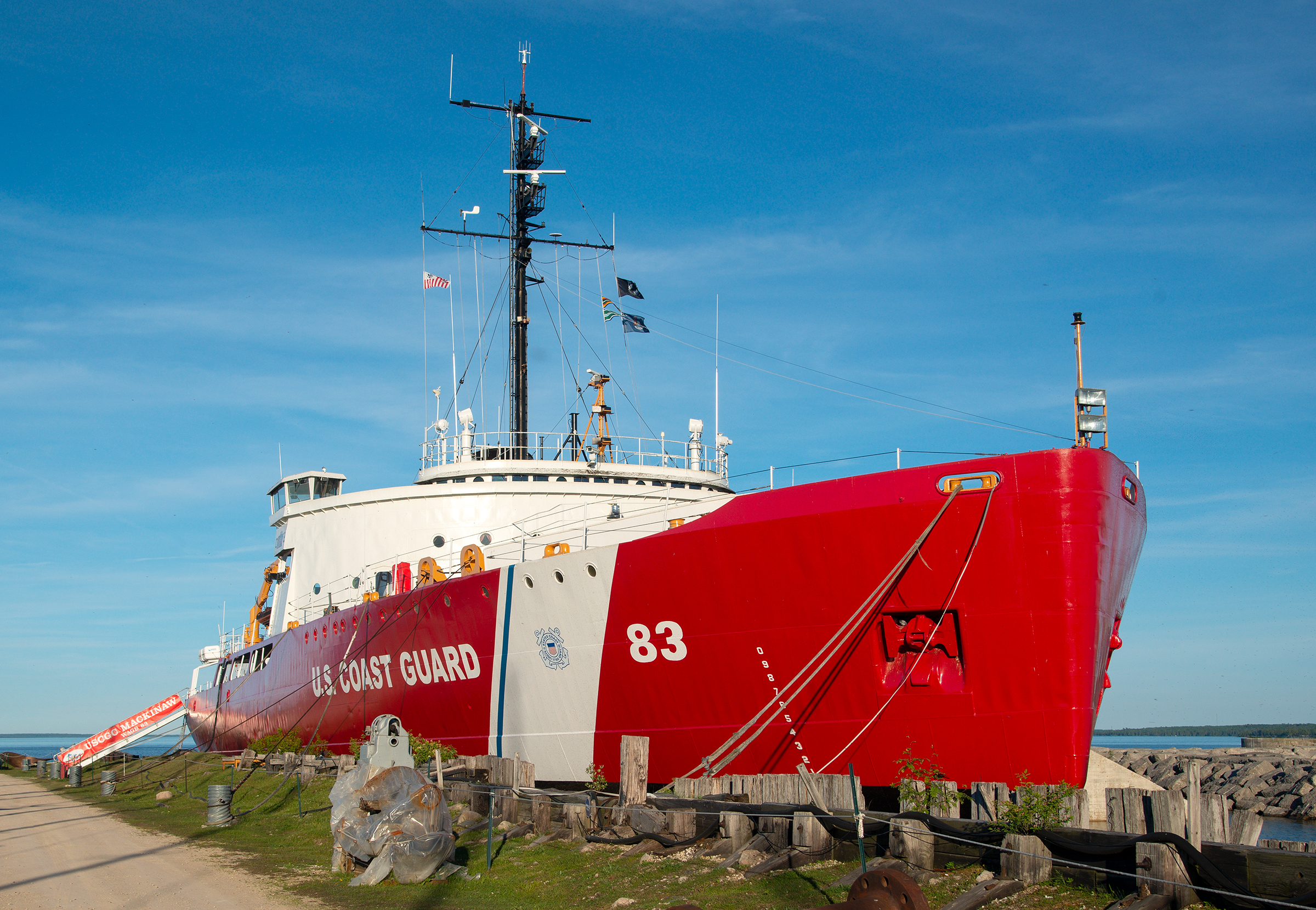
The USCGC Mackinaw (WAGB-83) as seen from her permanent berth at the SS Chief Wawatam dock at Mackinaw City, Michigan, 2019

USCGC Mackinaw (WAGB-83) is a decommissioned United States Coast Guard icebreaker which operated on the Great Lakes for 62 years. A state-of-the-art icebreaker when she was launched in 1944, Mackinaw was built to extend the shipping season on the Great Lakes into the winter months and thereby strengthen the wartime economy of the United States during World War II. Unlike the U.S. Coast Guard's large icebreakers before and since, Mackinaw was designed specifically for use in the shallow, freshwater Great Lakes.

Mackinaw was homeported in Cheboygan, Michigan for her entire Coast Guard career, travelling as needed into Lakes Superior, Huron, Michigan and Erie during icebreaking season to keep shipping lanes and harbors open. After her decommissioning in 2006 in the face of high operating costs, she sailed to a permanent berth in Mackinaw City, Michigan to become the Icebreaker Mackinaw Maritime Museum.

The decommissioned Mackinaw was immediately replaced by a smaller multipurpose Coast Guard cutter, also named Mackinaw (USCGC Mackinaw (WLBB-30)) and also homeported in Cheboygan.

== Construction ==
In the fall of 1941, the United States briefly borrowed the Soviet icebreaker Krassin. Although attempts to lease the icebreaker from the USSR for a year fell through, she was studied by the Coast Guard and her design influenced that of the Coast Guard icebreakers, including Mackinaw, constructed at that time. Another influence was Lieutenant Commander Edward Thiele, USCG, who travelled to Europe on vacation just before the United States entered the war and informed himself of modern icebreaker designs, particularly that of the state-of-the-art Swedish Ymer. Finally, the icebreaking features of Great Lakes rail ferries which operated in heavy ice in the Straits of Mackinac were studied. The resulting preliminary design of the Mackinaw was by the Coast Guard Naval Engineering Division and the final design by naval architects Gibbs & Cox of New York. Gibbs & Cox set up a special icebreaker design section for the Mackinaw and the Wind class of icebreakers.

After her construction was authorized on December 17, 1941, the Mackinaw was laid down on March 20, 1943, at Toledo Shipbuilding Company in Toledo, Ohio. The Toledo Shipbuilding Company was unprepared to undertake a shipbuilding project this large and complex and when the ship remained incomplete more than two years after the company took on the project, the Toledo Shipbuilding Company went bankrupt due to penalties levied for the delayed construction. The American Ship Building Company took over and Mackinaw was side-launched on March 4, 1944, and commissioned on December 20, 1944 under the command of Commander Edwin J. Roland. Due to war efforts Toledo area male workers were at an all-time low. The shipyard opened their hiring to Toledo area women. Mackinaw's eventual cost was $10 million, a substantial overrun of her projected cost of $8M and a very high cost for a ship of that era.

Mackinaw's design is based on the Wind class of icebreakers, but she is built specifically for use on the Great Lakes. She was built longer and wider than the ocean-going Wind-class vessels so that she would draw less water in the comparatively shallow water of the Great Lakes. The cooling system which circulates fresh water through her diesel engines draws directly from the water surrounding the ship. She is constructed of mild steel rather than the high-tensile steel of the Wind class.

However, Mackinaw's design shares many characteristics with that of the Wind-class icebreakers, such as a relatively short length in proportion to the great engine power developed, a cut-away forefoot, rounded bottom, and fore, aft and side heeling tanks. Diesel electric machinery was chosen for its controllability and resistance to damage. Although the original blueprints of the Mackinaw called for a length of 300 feet (91 m), in the event she was built with a length of 290 feet (88 m).

The Mackinaw's double hull is very strong. The frames between the two hulls are spaced about 16 inches apart and form a truss. Voids between the inner and outer hull are filled with fuel tanks and ballast tanks. Water can be pumped rapidly into and out of the ballast tanks (160 tons in 90 seconds) so that the ship heels from side to side through an arc of 24 degrees; this pushes ice away from the sides of the ship. The ballast tanks can also be used to trim the ship fore and aft.

As well as her twin 14-foot (4.3 m) stern propellers, Mackinaw also has a 12-foot (3.7 m) bow propeller, which pulled water from underneath the ice ahead of the ship; when the Mackinaw rode her bow up onto the ice using her cut-away forefoot, the unsupported ice broke apart under the ship's weight into the hollow space underneath. The turbulent wash from the bow propeller also helped the hull slide through the ice around it. Mackinaw could break through up to 42 inches (1.1 m) of solid "blue" ice and up to 38 to 40 feet (11.6 to 12.2 m) of shattered, heaped-up "windrow" ice. The sides of her hull are protected by an "ice belt" of 1.625-inch-thick (41.3 mm) steel plating up to several feet above her waterline, while her bottom is armored with 1.375-inch-thick (34.9 mm) steel.

Each of the three propellers has its own Westinghouse DC electric motor. The motor driving the bow propeller is capable of 3,300 hp (2,461 kW) and those driving the stern propellers can produce 5,000 hp (3,728 kW) each. These motors are driven by six diesel generator sets, each set comprising a Fairbanks-Morse 38D8-1/8 diesel engine and an accompanying electrical generator. The electrical output of the six generator sets can be switched to the three electric motors in different combinations. When breaking ice, two generators can be assigned to each of the two aft propellers and two generators to the bow propeller. When cruising in open water, each of Mackinaw's aft propellers can be driven by one, two or three generators.

For ground tackle Mackinaw shipped two 6,000 lb (2,700 kg) stockless bower anchors, each with 90 fathoms (160 m) of chain composed of 2-inch-diameter (51 mm) links. Until they were removed in 1982, two twelve-ton cranes on the fantail could be used to handle seaplanes or buoys. Mackinaw was also equipped to supply fuel oil to remote lighthouses.

== Service history ==
The Mackinaw was constructed to extend the shipping season on the Great Lakes during World War II. Ice formation on the Lakes caused the shipping season to end in late December, not able to reopen until the ice melted in late March or early April. Prior to the war, the light icebreakers USCGC Escanaba and USCGC Tahoma had worked to keep the shipping lanes open in winter, but once the U.S. entered the war these two cutters were reassigned to the north Atlantic. The Coast Guard calculated that extending the shipping season by ten days in winter would allow the delivery of an additional three and a half million tons of iron ore, coal and limestone to the steel industry, or alternatively of 120 million bushels of grain to food markets.

=== 1945-1960 ===
The Mackinaw's first assignment after she was launched in the final winter of World War II was to train 25 Soviet sailors from January 20 to February 6, 1945, before the sailors took up engineering duties on a lend-lease Wind class icebreaker. After the war ended Mackinaw continued on icebreaking duty in the Great Lakes; at that time, the channels between the Great Lakes and the open ocean were not yet large enough to accommodate her. The Mackinaw was then the largest member of a collection of icebreaking Coast Guard cutters on the Great Lakes which also included 180-foot buoy tenders and 110-foot tugboats. During the late 1970s and through the 1980s the latter were replaced by 140-foot Bay-class tugboats. Starting in 1968 and continuing until the last was decommissioned in 1989, one or another of the Coast Guard's Wind-class icebreakers would help out in winter. (Note: 1968: USCGC Eastwind. 1969-1970: USCGC Westwind. 1972: USCGC Edisto. 1973-74: USCGC Southwind. 1975-1981: USCGC Westwind. 1978-1989: USCGC Northwind.) The Mackinaw and these other Coast Guard icebreakers provided safe passage for freighters as they delivered their cargo of taconite, grain, and other resources around the Great Lakes to ports such as Detroit, Chicago, and Gary.

Mackinaw's icebreaking season each year depended on that winter's ice accumulation on the Great Lakes but typically lasted about 70 days. The season generally began in mid-December and continued until warming weather in spring melted the lake ice, which might be as late as May. A month-long "Charlie period" starting in mid-February took the ship out of service for recovery by both ship and crew from the round-the-clock stresses of icebreaking.

During the icebreaking season the Mackinaw maintained shipping lanes through the ice in Whitefish Bay at the eastern end of Lake Superior, along the St. Marys River connecting Lakes Superior and Huron, and through the Straits of Mackinac connecting Lakes Huron and Michigan. She occasionally cleared ice on the Detroit and St. Clair rivers connecting Lakes Huron and Erie. In very severe winters she visited icebound ports on the lower Great Lakes as far away as Buffalo on eastern Lake Erie. Wherever she went, Mackinaw broke the ice around any trapped ships that she encountered and escorted them to open water.

In the spring of 1947, the Mackinaw and the USCGC Tupelo opened ice-clogged Buffalo harbor. Working from May 9 to 14, they freed 38 ships trapped in ice outside the harbor and escorted them in, and freed 49 ships trapped inside the harbor and led them out. Mackinaw returned the next spring with the USCGC Acacia and during March 17 and 18 broke a passage into the ice-locked harbor which allowed 12 ships to leave. This was the earliest known date in over 50 years that ships had been able to leave Buffalo Harbor in the spring. Mackinaw returned to Buffalo again in April 1961 to lead Tupelo and the Coast Guard tugboats USCGC Kaw and Ojibwa in escorting vessels in and out of the ice-clogged harbor.

The Mackinaw did not routinely perform search and rescue missions; these were normally carried out by smaller, faster, nimbler Coast Guard cutters, boats and aircraft. The Mackinaw's first large search and rescue mission was not until the disappearance of Northwest Orient Airlines Flight 2501 over Lake Michigan on the night of 23 June 1950. Mackinaw, along with other Coast Guard and Navy ships and state police forces, fruitlessly searched for survivors and instead collected airplane debris and human body parts from a wide swath of Lake Michigan. "It was horrible," said David Kaplan, a boatswain's mate on the Mackinaw. "We picked up 32 buckets of remains and stored them in the walk-in cooler until the medical examiner came and took them. We found a lady's purse that looked intact until we opened it. The glass in the small make-up mirror was pulverized."

Mackinaw's powerful engines made her useful for towing large vessels in distress, starting when she towed the U.S. Navy minesweeper USS Elusive into Detroit in late February 1945. Mackinaw had been escorting Elusive through the ice from Lorain to Chicago when the minesweeper's propeller was damaged by ice in Lake Erie.

On November 21, 1956 the 7,300-ton grain carrier J. P. Wells was caught in a storm packing 65 mph winds on Lake Superior. Her rudder was damaged and the freighter began sailing in circles. The Mackinaw cancelled plans to invite the families of the crew to a Thanksgiving dinner onboard and sailed to assist the freighter. Mackinaw, accompanied by the USCGC Mesquite, towed the J. P. Wells to Whiskey Bay in Lake Superior, 15 miles north of the Soo Locks, where the freighter anchored waiting for a commercial tug to tow her to Sault Ste. Marie for repairs. Thanksgiving was celebrated underway.

During the construction of the Mackinac Bridge from 1954 to 1957, the Mackinaw would clear away ice floes piling up against the massive caissons surrounding the bridge piers being constructed. This allowed the foundations of the bridge to settle into place undisturbed during the winter. The icebreaker would work all day around the caissons for several days at a time, anchoring nearby at night and resuming work the next morning.

=== 1960-1990 ===
On the afternoon of November 29, 1960, the freighter SS Francisco Morazan ran aground in a snowstorm off South Manitou Island in Lake Michigan. The Mackinaw arrived to help the next morning, joining USCGC Mesquite which was already on scene. A ship's boat from Mackinaw was able to take off the wife of the Morazan's captain, who was airlifted from Mackinaw to Traverse City. On December 1, the USCGC Sundew, the salvage tug John Roan V, and the tug's companion barge Maintland joined the rescue effort.

The Sundew and Mesquite departed that night. On the following day a salvage engineer and an insurance agent sent by Morazan's owners from New York, along with salvage engineers from Roan Salvage of Sturgeon Bay, were airlifted to Morazan. After evaluating the ship's condition, they concluded was that although the cargo could be salvaged, Morazan could not, and the Roan Salvage engineers departed. Meanwhile, the weather deteriorated until at times fifteen-foot waves were breaking over Morazan and the ship began to break up. On December 4 ship's boats from Mackinaw took the captain, his twelve-man crew and the two owner's representatives off Morazan and Mackinaw delivered them to Traverse City.

On May 10, 1965 Mackinaw was on-scene commander of the Coast Guard's rescue efforts after the Norwegian ship MV Topdalsfjord collided with and sank the U.S. bulk carrier SS Cedarville near the Mackinac Bridge. Mackinaw's crew pulled bodies from the water and took on the survivors of the Cedarville from the German MV Weissenberg which had rescued them.

On November 19, 1966 the German freighter MV Nordmeer grounded and sank in shallow water seven miles north of Thunder Bay Island in Lake Huron. The Mackinaw sailed from Cheboygan, collected 35 members of the crew and the ship's dog and carried them to Alpena either on the 20th or 21st. Nordmeer's captain and seven crewmen stayed on board to plan a salvage operation. A week later, a gale struck the Nordmeer with 50 mph winds and 22-foot seas. The salvage crew radioed for help on November 29 and the Mackinaw returned to the vicinity, but the weather and the Nordmeer's position on Thunder Bay Shoal made it impossible for the icebreaker to approach the stricken freighter. A Coast Guard helicopter co-piloted by Lieutenant Jack Rittichier flew from Detroit and airlifted the eight crewmen to Mackinaw. The Nordmeer broke apart soon afterward.

In 1967, the Mackinaw travelled through the Welland Canal and visited Montreal to attend the Expo 67 International and Universal Exposition. This trip incidentally demonstrated that because of the expansion of the Saint Lawrence Seaway over the years, Mackinaw was no longer restricted to the Great Lakes, although the design of her power plant still restricted her to fresh water. She visited Toronto in July 1986 and in 2002.

Early on December 8, 1976, the ore carrier Cliffs Victory was forced out of her channel on the Saint Marys River by a sudden surge of current-driven ice and ran aground. After some of the Cliffs Victory's cargo was unloaded into a barge, the Mackinaw tried unsuccessfully all the next day to pull the ore carrier off the submerged shoal on which she was grounded. Cliffs Victory remained aground until the early morning of 11 December, when Mackinaw and three tugboats freed her from the shoal. In the meantime, more than 60 other ships had lined up waiting for the river to be cleared, including six ocean-going freighters hurrying to reach the St. Lawrence Seaway before it closed on the 18th. This was the worst shipping jam on the Saint Marys River since 1926.

The 1984 Great Lakes navigation season officially opened on March 26 but as commercial shipping began to move through the Lakes, unexpected winds drove ice from Lake Huron into the St. Clair River, blocking the river from April 5 to 29. The St. Clair connects Lake Erie and the Saint Lawrence Seaway with Lake Huron and the other Great Lakes. The consequent ice jam set records for both its economic impact and its lateness in the icebreaking season.

Six cargo ships were driven ashore by the ice. Eighteen ships became trapped in a mile-and-a-half stretch of the river. As many as 87 ore carriers and oceangoing freighters waited outside the ice jam, at a total cost estimated at $1.7 million each day.

The Mackinaw sailed from Cheboygan on April 9. Along with four smaller U.S. Coast Guard cutters and the Canadian Coast Guard icebreakers CCGS Des Groseilliers and CCGS Griffon, she led convoys through the ice jam day after day. By the time the ice was dispersed by time and weather, 300 ships had made their way through the congested St. Clair River. Thousands of onlookers watched "the ice jam of the century" from the river banks and amateur radio operators listened to VHF radio traffic among the ships.

=== 1990-2006 ===
In 1991, Mackinaw's first female sailors, both enlisted and officers, began to report aboard following an overhaul to the ship's living quarters. During the summer, the regular female crewmembers made way for female cadets from the Coast Guard Academy.

In 1998, Mackinaw's white hull with the blue and red Coast Guard stripe on the bow was painted red with a white and blue bow stripe. All of the Coast Guard's other full-sized icebreakers had already been repainted from white to red in 1972 and 1973.

The Mackinaw approached the end of her service as she became too expensive to maintain. The Coast Guard had scheduled her for decommissioning in 1982, 1988, and 1994, but cancelled each decommissioning after objections from the shipping industry and Congress. The closing chapter of the icebreaker's service history finally opened in December of 2000, when the Coast Guard called for designs of the ship's replacement. The annual cost of maintaining the ship was a little over US$4 million, and Coast Guard spokesman Jack O'Dell said at that time, "She's extremely old, and she's just becoming impossible to operate. Ships have a life span, and once they've reached that life span, they break down. This one's reached her life span." The Coast Guard chose a design for a combination icebreaker and buoy tender, also to be named Mackinaw.

In the spring of 2004, the Cheboygan City Council sent out feelers to its constituents to see if any group would be willing to take possession of Mackinaw after its projected decommissioning in June 2006 and to keep the ship in the Mackinac Straits area—ideally in Cheybogan. The city did not want to own and maintain the ship itself. In August of that year a committee, the Icebreaker Mackinaw Maritime Museum (IMMM), was formed to develop the ship as a museum. Michigan's congressional delegation was enlisted to help and introduced legislation which directed the Coast Guard to convey Mackinaw to Cheboygan upon decommissioning. Cheboygan, for its part, hoped the legislation would allow the city to immediately transfer the ship to the IMMM.

By the early months of 2006, little progress had been made. The legislation had passed in the U.S. House of Representatives but was stalled in the Senate, and moorings for the proposed museum in Cheboygan had not yet been found. The IMMM began work on a backup plan to host the museum in Mackinaw City, a village 15 miles north of Cheboygan. Mackinaw City's high tourist traffic would improve the museum's financial viability, and a member of the IMMM's board owned suitable moorings there at the former railroad dock for the ferry SS Chief Wawatam. In this alternate plan, the General Services Administration (GSA) would take possession of the ship upon decommissioning (as is usual for decommissioned U.S. government ships) and then transfer it to the IMMM.

In the last days before the Mackinaw's decommissioning on June 10, 2006, this alternate plan was adopted. After 62 years of service, Mackinaw was decommissioned in Cheboygan at a ceremony shared by the commissioning of her successor Coast Guard icebreaker, the new Mackinaw. On June 21, the decommissioned Mackinaw, loaded with civilian passengers, sailed to Mackinaw City and moored at her permanent berth. On June 30, after briefing the IMMM on how to operate the moored ship, the Coast Guard crew departed and the IMMM took over from the GSA as Mackinaw's custodians; full title to the ship was to be transferred from the GSA to the IMMM 60 months later. The Icebreaker Mackinaw Maritime Museum received its first visitors in the tourist season of 2007.

== As museum ship ==
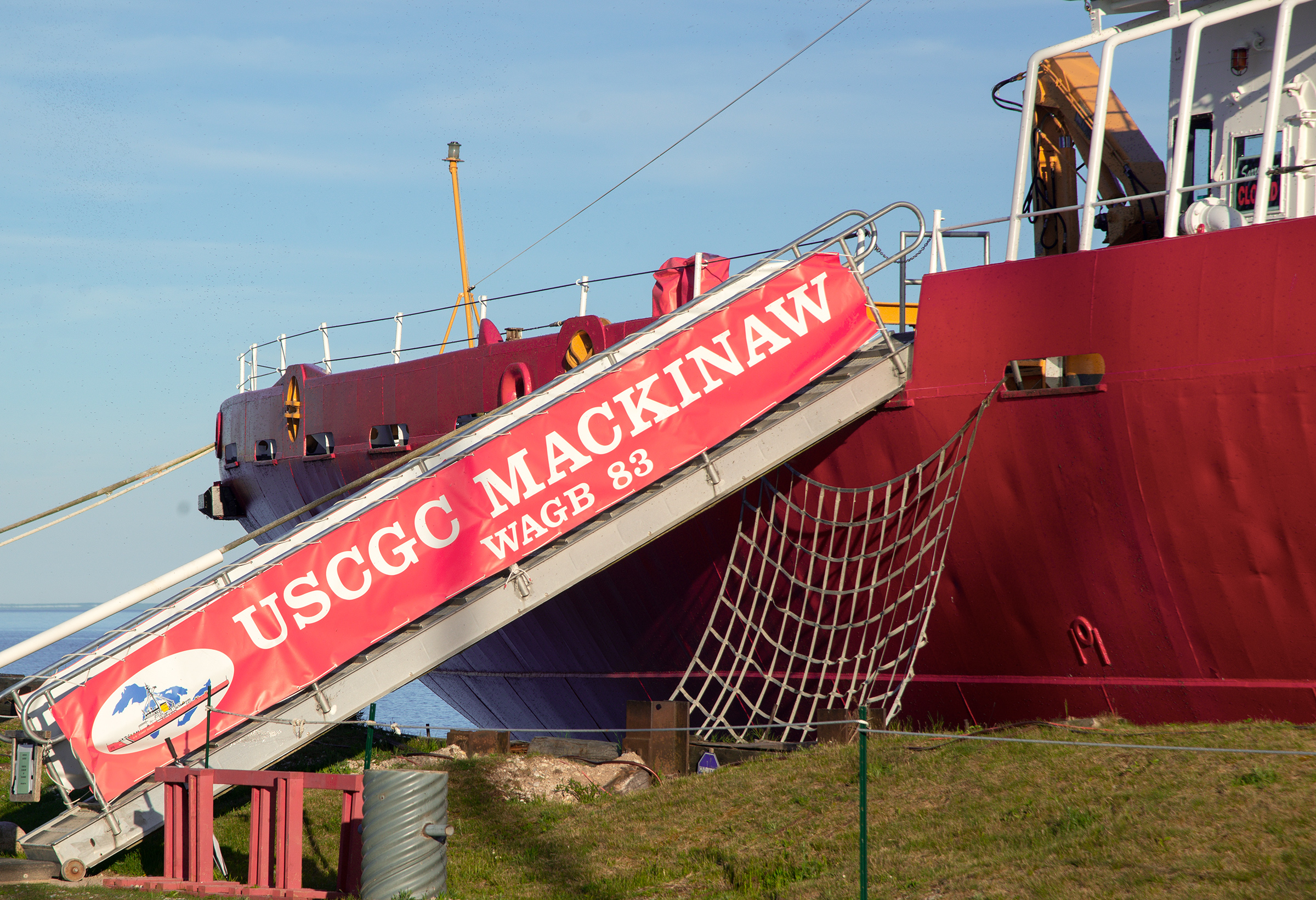
Visitor access

The Icebreaker Mackinaw Maritime Museum is moored at the eastern end of the old SS Chief Wawatam railroad dock; entry to the area is just south of Shepler's Marine Service. The museum provides educational tours and overnight stays on the vessel. Visitors can tour the mess deck, the captain's quarters, bridge, engine room, wardroom, sick bay and other areas. A retail store on the vessel sells relevant products. A fee is charged to visitors but all current and former USCG personnel are admitted free upon presentation of proper identification.

=== Amateur radio ===
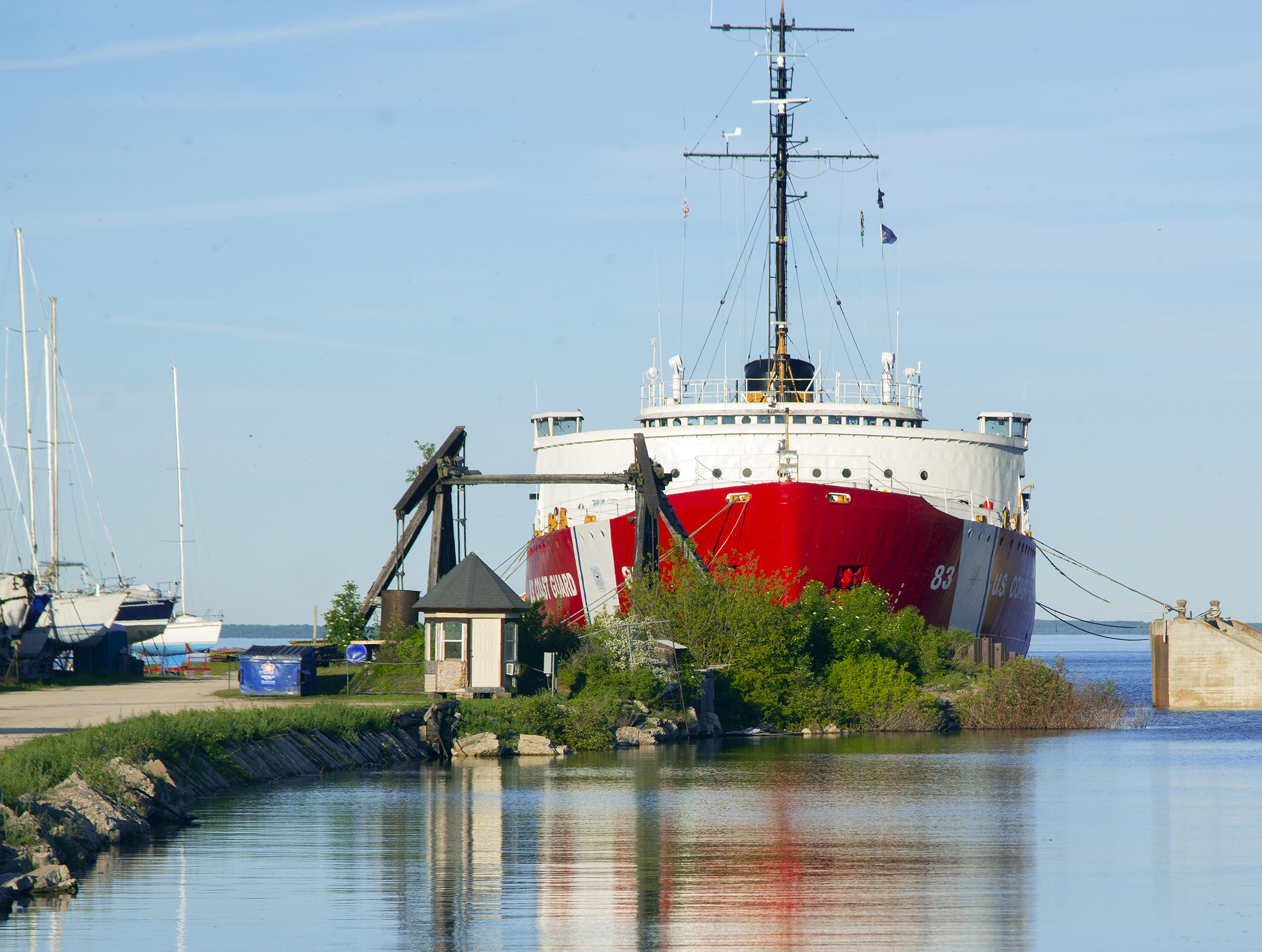
Masts and antennae

The Charlevoix, Cheboygan, Emmet Counties Public Service Communications Organization (CCECPSCO), has established a full-time amateur radio station on board the Icebreaker Mackinaw Maritime Museum.

The CCECPSCO has two repeaters on Mackinaw to provide communications coverage throughout the Straits of Mackinac. These repeaters, operating under the call-sign W8AGB to match the ship's WAGB-83 designation, are on a radio frequency of 145.110 MHz with 103.5 Hz PL tone and 444.375 MHz with 107.2 Hz PL tone. The organization is also actively assisting the museum with restoration and operation of various communications, navigation, and power systems. Included with the radios on board the ship are two Sunair RT-9000 HF transceivers with matching antenna couplers and vertical antennas. The installation of a third RT-9000 paired with an LPA-9600 solid-state kilowatt amplifier and CU-9100 kilowatt autotuner was scheduled for spring 2010, along with a Sunair F-9800 automatic pre/post filter for each radio to permit simultaneous operation of all three stations, and Sunair RCU-9310 remote control panels.

The vessel is equipped with a 160-40 meter dipole antenna, antenna couplers and vertical antennas linked to the two Sunair RT-9000 transceivers. The CCECPSCO group planned to add extra antennae for VHF and UHF repeater use and a KC8TU customized wire antenna.

Amateur radio operators visiting Mackinaw may operate the W8AGB station whenever a CCECPSCO member is present. The CCECPSCO conducts Amateur Radio Field Day operations from Mackinaw on the fourth full weekend in June.

== Awards ==
- American Campaign Medal -
- World War II Victory Medal -
- National Defense Service Medal with three service stars -
- Global War on Terrorism Service Medal -
