= Tupelo =

Tupelo commonly refers to:

- Tupelo (tree), a small genus of deciduous trees with alternate, simple leaves
- Tupelo, Mississippi, the county seat and the largest city of Lee County, Mississippi

Tupelo may also refer to:

== Places ==
- Tupelo, Arkansas, a town in Jackson County, Arkansas, United States
- Tupelo, Oklahoma, a city in Coal County, Oklahoma, United States

== Ships ==
- USCGC Tupelo (WLB-303), a Cactus (A) Class 180 foot buoy tender
- USS Tupelo (YN-75), an Ailanthus-class net laying ship later renamed the USS Winterberry (AN-56)

== Music ==
- "Tupelo" (song), 1985 the second single by Australian post-punk band Nick Cave and the Bad Seeds
- "Tupelo", a song by John Lee Hooker from Chill Out 1995, originally released in 1962
- "Uncle Tupelo", an alternative country music group from Belleville, Illinois, active between 1987 and 1994

== Other ==
- Tupelo Press, an American not-for-profit literary press founded in 1999

== See also ==
- Tupelo Honey, a 1971 album by Van Morrison
- Uncle Tupelo, an American musical group
- "Back to Tupelo", a 2004 song from Shangri-La (Mark Knopfler album)
