= Jack Columbus Rittichier =

Jack Columbus Rittichier (August 17, 1933 – June 9, 1968) was the highest-ranked American Coast Guard officer killed during the Vietnam War and the first Coast Guardsman killed in action during the Vietnam War.

Upon his graduation from Kent State University in 1955, he had been commissioned a second lieutenant in the United States Air Force (USAF) where he was trained to fly the B-47 Stratojet. He left the USAF as a captain in 1962. Rittichier had distinguished himself in the Coast Guard as a helicopter rescue pilot, having been awarded the Air Medal in June 1967 for saving eight men from the wreck of the MV Nordmeer on Lake Huron the previous year. Lieutenant Rittichier arrived in Vietnam around March 1968 as an exchange pilot to the USAF's 37th Aerospace Rescue and Recovery Squadron which was based at Da Nang Air Base. He was one of three Coast Guard exchange pilots who had arrived in South Vietnam at this time.

On June 9, 1968, Rittichier and three USAF crewmen took off in their Sikorsky HH-3E, also known as the Jolly Green Giant, to rescue a Marine Corps pilot who had been shot down near the border with Laos. While attempting this rescue, his helicopter was struck by heavy ground fire and exploded while attempting to land.

The MVP award for Kent State University's Golden Flashes football team was named after their former captain as the Lt. Jack Columbus Rittichier Award.
