= Larry W. Maysey =

Larry Wayne Maysey
- Sgt Larry Wayne Maysey
- Born: May 18, 1946; Chester Borough, New Jersey, U.S.
- Died: November 9, 1967 (aged 21) in Laos
- Military career
- Allegiance: United States of America
- Branch: United States Air Force
- Service years: 1966–1967
- Rank: Sergeant
- Unit: 37th Aerospace Rescue and Recovery Squadron
- Conflicts: Vietnam War †
- Awards: Air Force Cross

Sergeant Larry Wayne Maysey (May 18, 1946 – November 9, 1967) was a United States Air Force pararescueman who was posthumously awarded the Air Force Cross, the Air Force's second-highest decoration (after the Medal of Honor).

== Early life ==
Maysey grew up in Chester Township, New Jersey and graduated from West Morris Regional High School (since renamed as West Morris Central High School). Soon after he graduated high school, he enlisted in the U.S. Air Force and 2 years later was sent to Vietnam.

== Air Force Cross ==
=== Action ===
On 8 November 1967 two HH-3E Jolly Green Giants of the 37th Aerospace Rescue and Recovery Squadron were launched on a night mission to extract five survivors of a Special Forces reconnaissance team. The site was known to be hot, surrounded by a well-disciplined, People's Army of Vietnam (PAVN) battalion. A Vietnamese Air Force (VNAF) and a United States Army helicopter had already been shot down and destroyed. Illuminated by a C-130 Hercules flare ship dropping LUU-2 parachute flares, Jolly 29 made a pickup of three survivors before being driven off by intense enemy fire. Jolly 29, with heavy battle damage, landed at the USMC Khe Sanh Combat Base. Maysey's helicopter Jolly 26 then attempted to pick up the remaining two survivors, both now wounded. Fighting, both in the air and on the ground, was intense. Maysey jumped from the safety of Jolly 26, and ran down a steep slope rescuing the two remaining men. Jolly 26 was now being hit with small arms fire. Just after Maysey had helped both survivors safely on board, a rocket propelled grenade struck the number one engine, fatally crippling the craft. The engine exploded, inverting the aircraft, which rolled and skidded down a deep ravine and burst into flames; a pilot and one other man survived the crash. Maysey received the Air Force Cross posthumously. The pilot Captain Gerald Young was rescued later that day and subsequently awarded the Medal of Honor.

=== Citation ===

Larry W. Maysey
Rank and organization: Sergeant, U.S. Air Force, 37th Aerospace Rescue and Recovery Squadron
Entered service at: Chester, New Jersey
Born: May 18, 1946, Morristown, New Jersey

The President of the United States of America, authorized by Title 10, Section 8742, United States Code, takes pride in presenting the Air Force Cross (Posthumously) to Sergeant Larry Wayne Maysey (AFSN: 12751422), United States Air Force, for extraordinary heroism in connection with military operations against an opposing armed force as an HH-3E Rescue Specialist (Pararescueman) of the 37th Aerospace Rescue and Recovery Squadron, 3d Air Rescue and Recovery Group, DaNang Air Base, Vietnam, in Southeast Asia on 9 November 1967. On that date, Sergeant Maysey attempted the night extraction of a ground reconnaissance team after his helicopter had been severely damaged. Two other helicopters had been shot down and a third extensively damaged in previous attempts. During the rescue attempt, Sergeant Maysey unhesitatingly exposed himself to the hail of hostile fire to assist wounded survivors into the helicopter. The hostile forces closed in quickly, and as the damaged helicopter departed, it was shot down. Though his extraordinary heroism, superb airmanship, and aggressiveness in the face of the enemy, Sergeant Maysey reflected the highest credit upon himself and the United States Air Force.

== Commendations ==
The following awards have been awarded to Sergeant Maysey:

Badge	U.S. Air Force Aircrew Badge (enlisted)		
Badge	Basic Parachutist Badge		
1st Row	Air Force Cross		Purple Heart
2nd Row	Air Medal	Air Force Good Conduct Medal	National Defense Service Medal
3rd Row	Vietnam Service Medal with 1 bronze Campaign star	Vietnamese Gallantry Cross with palm and frame	Vietnam Campaign Medal with 1960– Device
