= 37th Helicopter Squadron =

US Air Force helicopter unit

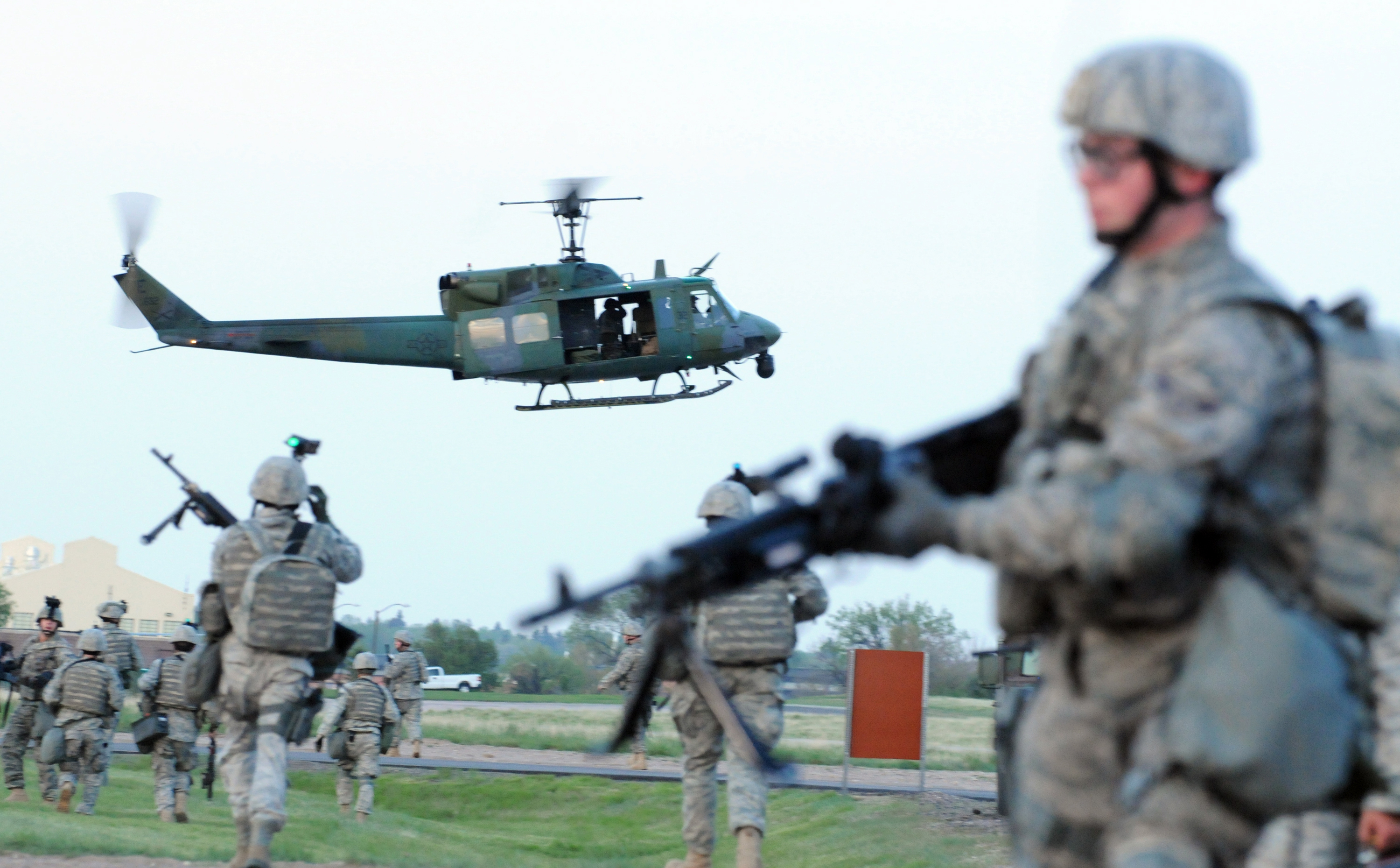
- A UH-1N belonging to the 37th Helicopter Squadron lands as 90th Security Forces Group move into place during an exercise that was part of the Nuclear Surety Inspection.
- Active: 1952–1955; 1966–1972; 1973–present
- Country: United States of America
- Branch: United States Air Force
- Type: Squadron
- Role: Missile Field Support; Search and rescue
- Part of: Air Force Global Strike Command
- Garrison/HQ: F.E. Warren Air Force Base, Wyoming
- Engagements: Korean War; Vietnam War
- Decorations: Presidential Unit Citation; Air Force Outstanding Unit Award; Republic of Korea Presidential Unit Citation; Republic of Vietnam Gallantry Cross with Palm

Insignia
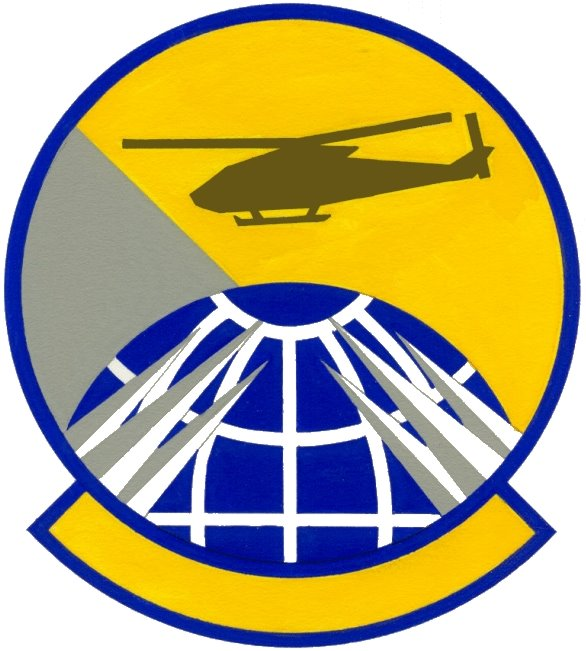
- 37th Helicopter Squadron emblem (approved 30 November 1988)
- Tail Code: FE

The 37th Helicopter Squadron is a United States Air Force unit assigned to the 582d Helicopter Group in support of the 90th Missile Wing located at Francis E. Warren Air Force Base, Wyoming. The unit is tasked with flight operations in support of the operation and security of F.E. Warren's intercontinental ballistic missile complex as well as search and rescue missions. The unit operates the UH-1N Huey helicopter.

== History ==
Performed search, rescue, and recovery missions in the Far East and in Southeast Asia in the conflicts in Vietnam. Since reactivation in 1973, unit performs nuclear convoy security and missile site support at Francis E. Warren AFB. The unit also flies numerous search & rescue missions and casualty evacuation sorties.

=== 37th Aerospace Rescue and Recovery Squadron ===
37th Aerospace Rescue and Recovery Squadron
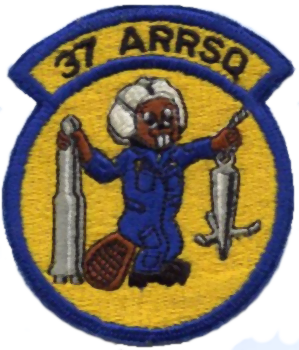
- 37th Aerospace Rescue and Recovery Squadron Emblem
- Active: January 1966 – November 1972
- Country: United States
- Branch: United States Air Force
- Type: Squadron
- Role: Rescue & Recovery
- Part of: 3d Aerospace Rescue and Recovery Group
- Nickname: Jolly Green
- Engagements: Vietnam War: Operation Ivory Coast; Bat 21 rescue

On 8 January 1966, the 37th ARRS was activated at Da Nang Air Base operating five HU-16s on loan from the 31st ARRS and the 33rd ARRS and with a detachment at Udorn Royal Thai Air Force Base. The squadron was responsible for aircrew recovery over North Vietnam, Laos and the Gulf of Tonkin.

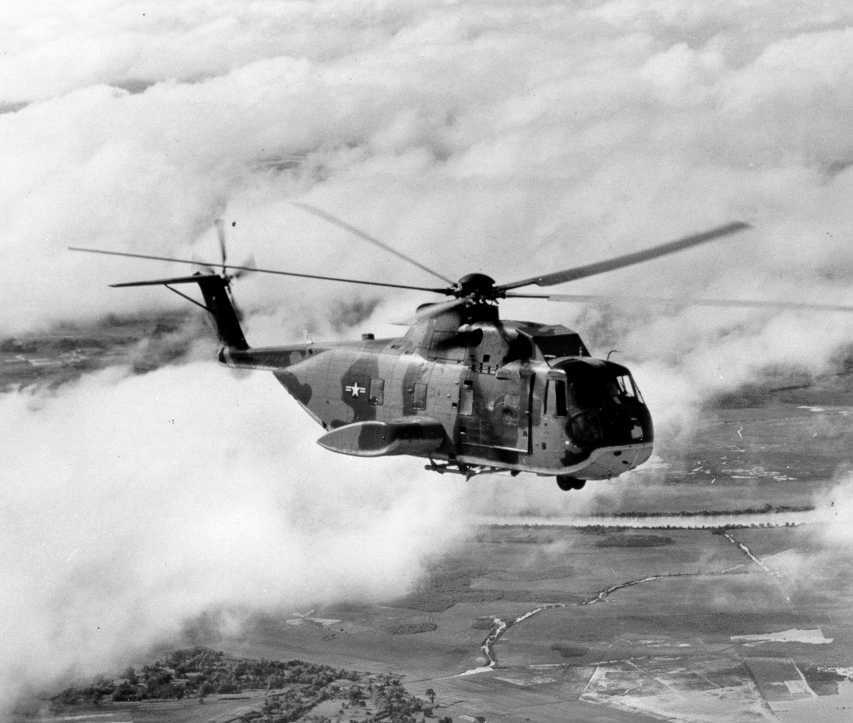
A 37th ARRS CH-3C over Vietnam.

On 30 March 1966, two HC-130s were delivered to Detachment 1 at Udorn RTAFB. A further three HC-130s were delivered to Udorn in June 1966.

On 16 January 1967, the squadron's HC-130s at Udorn RTAFB were transferred to the newly formed 39th ARRS. Also on 16 January Detachment 2, 37th ARRS was re-designated from Det. 5, 38th ARRS at Udorn RTAFB operating HH-3s.

On 2 February 1967, all five HU-16s assigned to the 37th ARRS were transferred to the 33rd ARRS at Naha, Okinawa.

September 1967, Detachment 2 at Udorn RTAFB received its first two HH-53Bs.

May 1967, Detachment 1 38th ARRS operating HH-3s at Danang Air Base was reassigned to the 37th ARRS.

March 1968, Detachment 2 at Udorn RTAFB was transferred to the 40th ARRS.

The 37th ARRS remained at Danang until it was inactivated on 30 November 1972. Five of its HH-53s were transferred to the 40th ARRS at Nakhon Phanom Royal Thai Air Force Base, while its two HH-43s remained at Danang as Detachment 7 of the 40th ARRS to provide base rescue during Operation Linebacker II.

=== Operations and losses ===
- 18 October 1966, Crown Bravo, HU-16B Tail No 51-7145 was on a search and rescue (SAR) orbit north of the DMZ when it radioed a Navy ship that it was returning to Danang. This was the last contact with the aircraft and no trace of the plane or seven-man crew was ever found.
- 16 February 1967, Jolly Green 56 took off to rescue the pilot of Dusty 71 an F-100 shot down over Laos. The helicopter received ground fire and the pilot, Captain Angelo Pullara, was hit and killed. The helicopter returned safely to Saravane, Laos. The Dusty 71 pilot was rescued by Jolly Green 37.
- 5 May 1967, six civilian men and a six-year-old boy were rescued by an amphibious aircraft piloted by Colonel Alan R. Vette, the squadron's commanding officer. The yachtsmen's sailing schooner, Dante Deo, was wrecked on Bombay Reef in the Paracel Islands, about 60 nautical miles (110 km) offshore, due east of the squadron's Danang base.
- 27 October 1967, Jolly Green 20, HH-3E Tail No 66-13283 was on a combat search and rescue (CSAR) mission over Laos when it was hit in the engine by ground fire while hovering. Aircraft was destroyed by bombing. Survivors and ground party rescued by Jolly Green 07.
- 9 November 1967, Jolly Green 26, HH-3E Tail No 66-13279 and Jolly Green 29 were scrambled to extract the five surviving members of a Military Assistance Command, Vietnam – Studies and Observations Group (MACV-SOG) reconnaissance team that had suffered heavy casualties in Laos. JG29 successfully extracted 3 indigenous team members before being hit by ground fire, it departed and made an emergency landing at Khe Sanh Combat Base. JG26 extracted Special Forces Specialist Four Joseph G. Kusick and Master Sergeant Bruce R. Baxter, both wounded, but JG26 was then hit by ground fire, crashed and burst into flames. A recovery team was inserted into the area and reached the crash site, but due to fading light, it was impossible to inspect the wreckage at that time. On the morning of 10 November, the pilot Captain Gerald O. Young was rescued after evading capture for some 17 hours after the crash. Later that morning the wreckage was searched and the charred remains of Kusick were recovered. The copilot Captain Ralph Brower, the flight engineer Staff Sergeant Eugene L Clay, the pararescueman Sergeant Larry W. Maysey and Master Sergeant Bruce Baxter were all killed in action-body not recovered. Captain Gerald Young was awarded the Medal of Honor.
- 28 February 1968, The ARRS made their 1,000 combat save since 1964 when Jolly Green 36 rescued Captain Gene I. Basel, 354th Tactical Fight Squadron pilot flying a Republic F-105D, Bu No 62-4385. When ejection handles failed to engage, the pilot was catapulted to the ground when his aircraft exploded. Pararescue Specialist Joseph M. Duffy went down on the hoist to extract pilot who had sustained two broken thigh bones. At the time of the rescue the Basel's parachute was entangled in branches and there was ground fire approaching his location. The rescue was accomplished in two hours.
- 9 June 1968, Jolly Green 23 HH-3E Tail No 67-14710 was on CSAR for First Lieutenant Walter R. Schmidt pilot of Hellborne 215, a USMC A-4C shot down over the A Shau Valley. Voice contact was established with Schmidt, who reported he possibly had a broken arm and leg. Several attempts at pickup were made by the lead helicopter, Jolly Green 22, but it was driven off by intense ground fire. After suppressive fire was put in, JG23 moved in to attempt the pickup, JG23 reported taking hits and then caught fire. The pilot attempted to land in a small clearing, but the helicopter exploded when it hit the ground and burned intensely. There were no indications anyone survived the crash. Pilot Lieutenant Jack Columbus Rittichier, USCG, co-pilot Captain Richard C. Yeend, flight engineer Staff Sergeant Elmer L. Holden and pararescueman Sergeant James D. Locker were all killed in action-body not recovered. The remains of the crew were returned and identified in September 2003. First Lieutenant Schmidt remains missing in action presumed dead.
- 1-2 July 1968, Jolly Greens 21, 22, 24, 27, 28, 29 and 31, participated in a Search and Rescue (SAR) mission for Lt Col Jack Modica, Jr. Scotch 3, who had ejected from his F-105 about 30 miles into North Vietnam. Four rescue attempts were made over the two days, with the first three Jolly Greens being driven off by intense ground fire. On the second day of the SAR, Lt Col Modica was rescued by Jolly Green 21, piloted by Lt Lance Eagan with A1C Joel Talley as Pararescueman. Lt Eagan received the Silver Star and A1C Talley was awarded the Air Force Cross (United States).
- 5 October 1968, Jolly Green 10 HH-3E tail No 65-12782 was hit by ground fire while attempting to extract a MACV-SOG team from the western A Shau Valley. The helicopter crashed killing the co-pilot Major Albert D. Wester and flight engineer Sergeant Gregory P. Lawrence. The pilot and pararescueman were joined by the MACV-SOG team and extracted by Jolly Green 32 which was also hit by ground fire and subsequently crash-landed.
- 24 October 1969, Jolly Green 28 HH-3E tail No 66-13281 dropped pararescueman Technical Sergeant Donald G Smith to rescue the pilot of F-100 Misty 11A over Laos. As Smith and the pilot were being raised, hostile fire rendered the hoist inoperative and the cable was sheared, dropping them fifteen feet to the ground. Smith's position was surrounded by hostile forces and JG28 was downed by hostile fire. Smith controlled and directed the aircraft providing suppressive fire, resulting in the safe recovery of all downed personnel, and he was awarded the Air Force Cross for his actions.
- 15 April 1970, Jolly Green 27, HH-3E Tail No 66-13280 and another Jolly Green were scrambled to rescue the survivors of a downed UH-1 near Dak Seang Camp, Kontum Province, Vietnam. JG27 made three rescue attempts, but was brought down by ground fire. The pilot Captain Travis H Scott was killed on impact. The copilot, Major Wofford, dragged the other two crewmen from the burning aircraft. The second HH-3 evacuated the survivors of the first HH-3 but was unable to rescue personnel in the downed UH-1. The flight engineer Technical Sergeant Gerald L. Hartzel and pararescueman Staff Sergeant Luther E Davis later died from their injuries. Major Wofford was awarded the Air Force Cross, and Captain Scott was posthumously awarded the Air Force Cross.
- 21 November 1970, Banana 01, HH-3E Tail No 68-12785 was deliberately crashed in the Son Tay POW Camp as part of Operation Ivory Coast.
- 25 November 1971, Jolly Green 70, HH-53C Tail No 68-10366 crashed into the Song Na River, Gia Dinh, South Vietnam while on a CSAR mission. All 4 crewmen were killed.
- 3 April 1972, Jolly Greens of the squadron made two attempts to pick up Lieutenant Colonel Iceal Hambleton Bat 21 Bravo near Quảng Trị, South Vietnam, both times, they were driven off with heavy damage to their aircraft. On 6 April Jolly Green 67 HH-53C Tail No 68-10365 was designated to make the rescue attempt, but as it came to a hover over Hambleton, it was raked by heavy fire. JG67 aborted the rescue attempt and tried to maneuver to safety, but the enemy fire continued and JG67 crashed in a huge fireball a few km south of the pickup point. The fire was intense and lasted several days. All 6 crewmembers were killed. The remains of the crew were returned in June 1994 and were buried as a group at Arlington National Cemetery in November 1997.
- 1 May 1972, Jolly Greens of the squadron evacuated 132 US advisers from Quảng Trị as the city was falling to the PAVN Easter Offensive
- 18 August 1972, HH-53C Tail No 68-10361 was destroyed on the ramp at Danang by a Vietcong 122mm rocket.

== Lineage ==
- Constituted as the 37th Air Rescue Squadron on 17 October 1952

Activated on 14 November 1952
Inactivated on 8 May 1955

- Redesignated 37th Aerospace Rescue and Recovery Squadron and activated on 14 December 1965 (not organized)

Organized on 8 January 1966
Inactivated on 29 December 1972

- Activated on 1 October 1973
- Redesignated 37th Air Rescue Squadron on 1 June 1989
- Redesignated 37th Rescue Squadron on 1 February 1993
- Redesignated 37th Rescue Flight on 1 May 1993
- Redesignated 37th Helicopter Flight on 1 May 1998
- Redesignated 37th Helicopter Squadron on 21 October 2005

=== Assignments ===
- 3d Air Rescue Group: 14 November 1952 – 8 May 1955
- Military Air Transport Service: 14 December 1965 (not organized)
- Military Airlift Command: 1 January 1966 (not organized)
- 3d Aerospace Rescue and Recovery Group: 8 January 1966
- 41st Aerospace Rescue and Recovery Wing: 20 August 1972 – 29 December 1972 (remained under operational control of 3rd Aerospace Rescue and Recovery Group)
- Aerospace Rescue and Recovery Service: 1 October 1973
- 39th Aerospace Rescue and Recovery Wing: 1 July 1978
- 41st Rescue and Weather Reconnaissance Wing: 1 February 1987
- Air Rescue Service: 1 August 1989
- 90th Operations Group: 1 February 1993 (attached to 20th AF Helicopter Operations Group (Provisional) after 1 August 2014)
- 582d Helicopter Group, 15 January 2015 – present

=== Stations ===
- Komaki Air Base, Japan, 14 November 1952
- Yokota Air Base, Japan, 23 July 1954 – 8 May 1955
- Da Nang Air Base, South Vietnam, 8 January 1966 – 29 December 1972
- Udorn Royal Thai Air Force Base, Thailand (1966–1968)
- Nakhon Phanom Royal Thai Air Force Base, Thailand
- Francis E. Warren Air Force Base, Wyoming, 1 October 1973 – present

=== Aircraft ===
- Boeing SB-29 Superfortress (1952–1955)
- Douglas SC-47 Skytrain (1952–1954)
- Lockheed HC-130 Hercules (1966–1967)
- Grumman HU-16 Albatross (1966–1967)
- Sikorsky HH-3 Jolly Green Giant (1967–1970)
- Sikorsky HH-53 Super Jolly Green Giant (1970–1972)
- Kaman HH-43 Huskie (1971–1972)
- Bell UH-1 Iroquois (1973–present)
- Bell HH-1 Iroquois (1974–1993)
- Bell TH-1 Iroquois (1974–1987)

== See also ==
- List of Douglas C-47 Skytrain operators
- List of Lockheed C-130 Hercules operators
- List of United States Air Force helicopter squadrons
- List of United States Air Force rescue squadrons
