= Gerald O. Young =

US Air Force officer and Medal of Honor recipient (1930–1990)

Gerald Orren Young
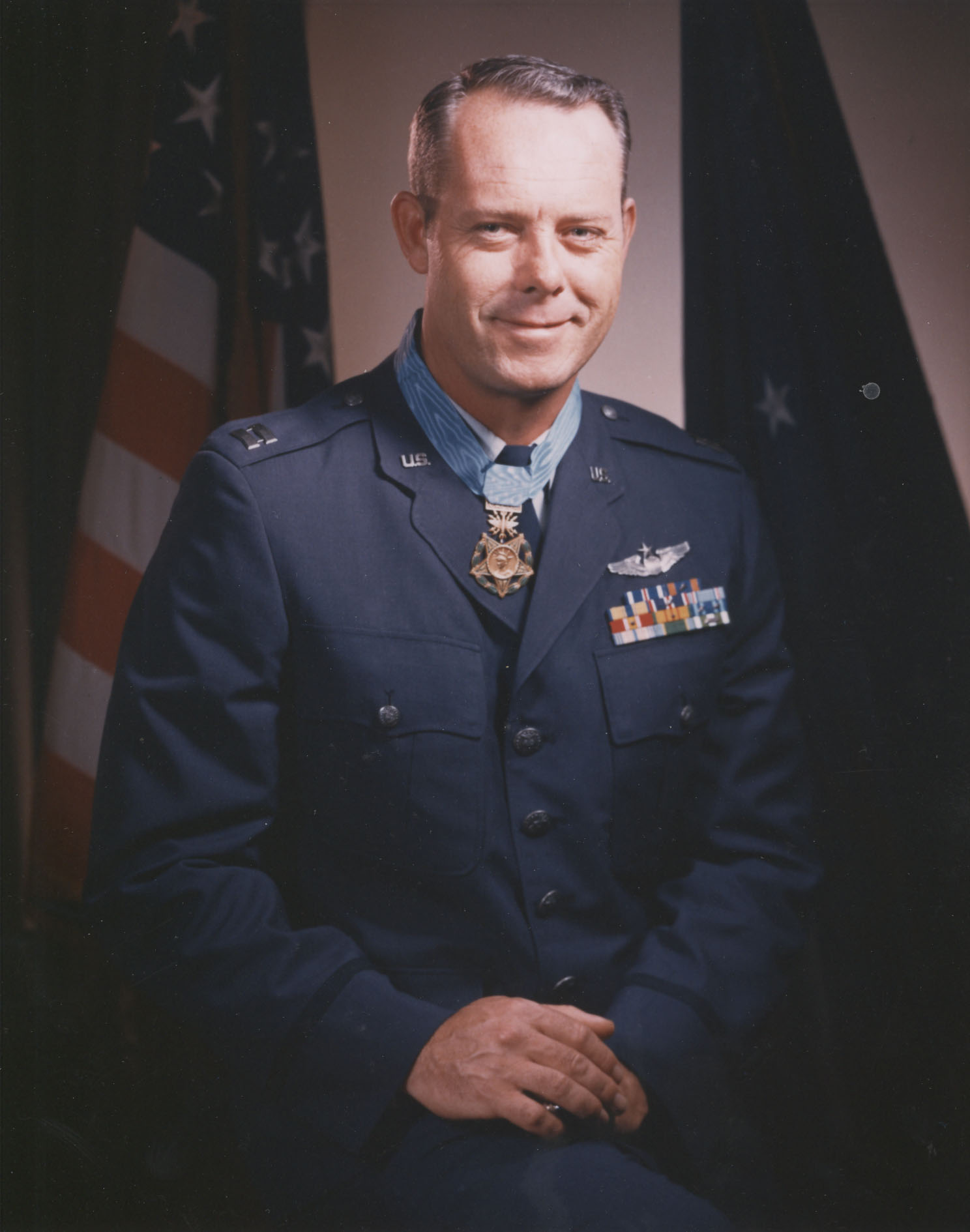
- Born: May 19, 1930; Chicago, Illinois, U.S.
- Died: June 6, 1990 (aged 60); Anacortes, Washington, U.S.
- Burial place: Arlington National Cemetery
- Military career
- Allegiance: United States of America
- Branch: United States Navy; United States Air Force
- Service years: 1947–1952, 1955–1956 (USN); 1956–1980 (USAF)
- Rank: Lieutenant Colonel
- Unit: 37th Aerospace Rescue and Recovery Squadron
- Conflicts: Vietnam War
- Awards: Medal of Honor; Distinguished Flying Cross; Purple Heart; Air Medal (3)

Gerald Orren Young (May 19, 1930 – June 6, 1990) was a United States Air Force officer and a recipient of the U.S. military's highest decoration—the Medal of Honor—for his actions in the Vietnam War.

== Early life ==
Gerald Young was born on May 19, 1930, in Chicago, Illinois.

== Military career ==
He joined the Navy as an aviation technician's mate and served from 1947 to 1952, and from 1955 to 1956, when he transferred to the Air Force. He completed the Aviation Cadet Training Program and was commissioned a 2nd lieutenant on January 18, 1958 at Reese Air Force Base, Texas.

After completion of helicopter training, he was assigned to the Marshall Islands from July to December 1958, where he took part in missions in support of the nuclear weapon tests. From December 1958 to January 1960, he served in Japan before being deployed to the 566th Strategic Missile Squadron at Francis E. Warren Air Force Base in Wyoming.

Young served in the 96th Strategic Aerospace Wing at Dyess Air Force Base in Texas, from June 1962 until November 1963. He was next sent to Barksdale Air Force Base in Louisiana, where he remained until October 1965. From October 1965 until August 1967, Young was assigned to the 381st Strategic Missile Wing at McConnell Air Force Base in Kansas.

=== Vietnam war ===
During the Vietnam War he served as a captain in the 37th Aerospace Rescue and Recovery Squadron, a helicopter unit operating out of Da Nang Air Force Base, Republic of Vietnam.

On the night of November 8–9, 1967, Young's aircraft was one of two HH-3E Jolly Green Giant helicopters sent to extract five survivors of a U.S. Army Special Forces reconnaissance team in Laos. The extraction site was known to be hot, surrounded by a North Vietnamese People's Army of Vietnam battalion. Two helicopters had already been shot down and destroyed in the area. Illuminated by a C-130 Hercules dropping LUU-2 parachute flares, Jolly 29 made a pickup of three survivors before being driven off by intense enemy fire. Young, piloting Jolly 26, then attempted to pick up the remaining two survivors, both now wounded. Fighting was intense both in the air and on the ground. A para-rescueman aboard Young's aircraft, Larry W. Maysey, jumped from the helicopter and ran down a steep slope, rescuing the two remaining men. Jolly 26 was now being hit with small arms fire. Just after Maysey had helped both survivors safely on board, a rocket-propelled grenade (RPG) struck the number one engine, fatally crippling the craft. The engine exploded, inverting the helicopter, which rolled and skidded down a deep ravine and burst into flames; Young and one other man survived the crash and escaped the burning wreckage. Despite severe wounds, Young evaded capture for 17 hours until being rescued later that day. As a result of Young's efforts, the other survivor of the crash was ultimately rescued and the bodies of those servicemembers who perished were also recovered. For these actions, he was awarded the Medal of Honor. The para-rescueman, Maysey, was posthumously awarded the Air Force Cross.

=== Post war ===
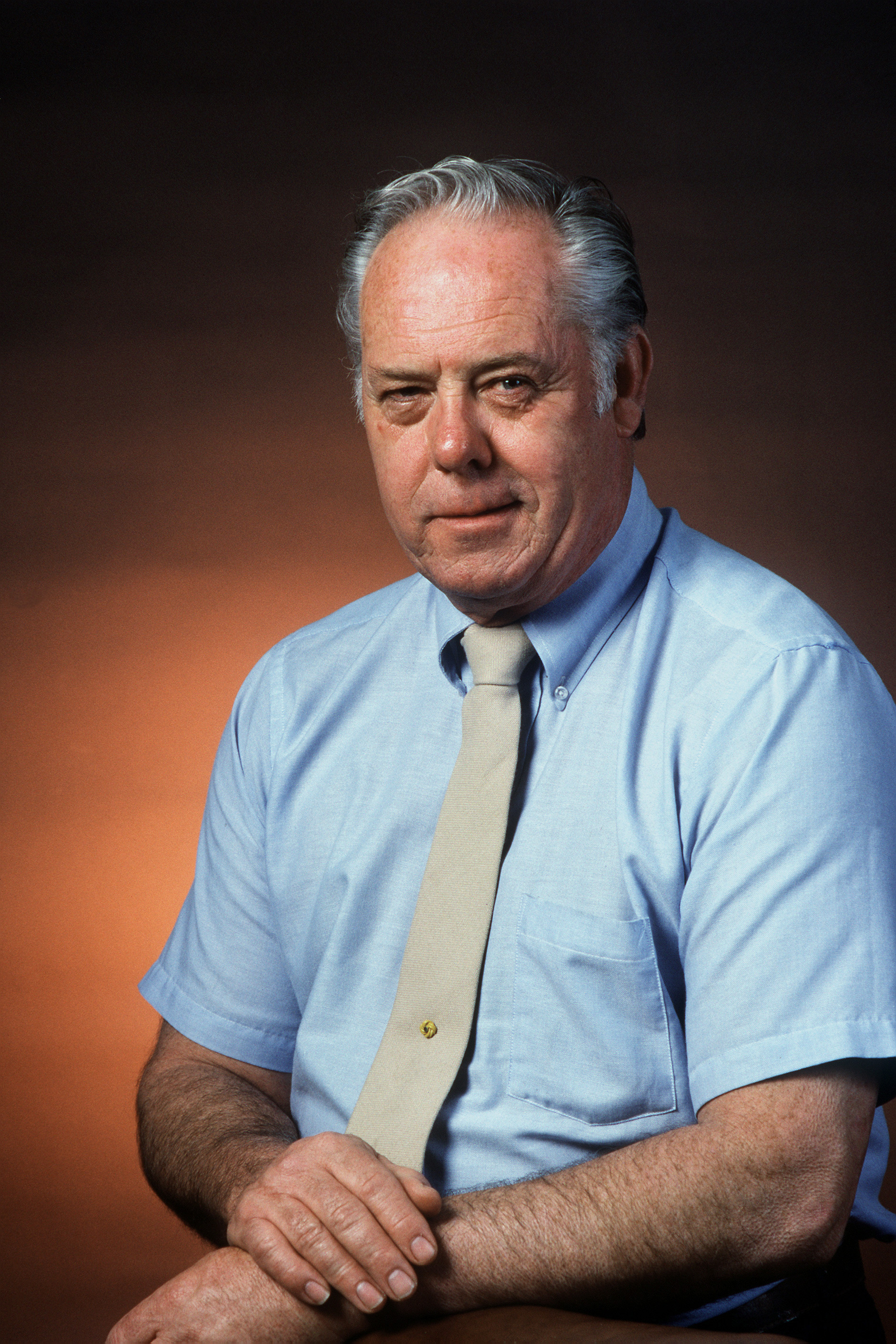
Young in 1986

Following his return to the US and subsequent hospitalisation for three months, Young was assigned to the 3637th Flying Training Squadron at Sheppard Air Force Base in Texas, serving from February 1968 to August 1969. From August 1969 to February 1971, he was assigned to helicopter units in Peterson Field in Colorado and at Fairchild Air Force Base in Washington.

He next attended the Defense Language Institute at Monterey and in December 1972, he was sent to Panama to help establish a rescue program for the Panamanian Air Force. Following duty in Panama, Young completed a bachelor of arts degree at the University of Maryland. He then served as air attache to Colombia, followed by role of assistant chief for combat plans of the 507th Tactical Air Control Center Squadron at Shaw Air Force Base in South Carolina, before his retirement from the Air Force on June 30, 1980, at the rank of lieutenant colonel.

== Later life ==
Young died of brain tumor at the age of 60 and was buried at Arlington National Cemetery, in Arlington, Virginia.

== Awards and decorations ==
His decorations include the following:

USAF Command pilot badge
Medal of Honor
Distinguished Flying Cross	Purple Heart	Air Medal with two bronze oak leaf clusters
Air Force Commendation Medal with bronze oak leaf cluster	Air Force Presidential Unit Citation	Air Force Outstanding Unit Award with two bronze oak leaf clusters
Air Force Good Conduct Medal	Navy Good Conduct Medal	National Defense Service Medal with service star
Vietnam Service Medal with bronze campaign star	Air Force Longevity Service Award with silver oak leaf cluster	Armed Forces Reserve Medal
Small Arms Expert Marksmanship Ribbon	Vietnam Gallantry Cross Unit Citation	Vietnam Campaign Medal

=== Medal of Honor citation ===
For conspicuous gallantry and intrepidity at the risk of his life above and beyond the call of duty. Capt. Young distinguished himself while serving as a helicopter rescue crew commander. Capt. Young was flying escort for another helicopter attempting the night rescue of an Army ground reconnaissance team in imminent danger of death or capture. Previous attempts had resulted in the loss of 2 helicopters to hostile ground fire. The endangered team was positioned on the side of a steep slope which required unusual airmanship on the part of Capt. Young to effect pickup. Heavy automatic weapons fire from the surrounding enemy severely damaged 1 rescue helicopter, but it was able to extract 3 of the team. The commander of this aircraft recommended to Capt. Young that further rescue attempts be abandoned because it was not possible to suppress the concentrated fire from enemy automatic weapons. With full knowledge of the danger involved, and the fact that supporting helicopter gunships were low on fuel and ordnance, Capt. Young hovered under intense fire until the remaining survivors were aboard. As he maneuvered the aircraft for takeoff, the enemy appeared at point-blank range and raked the aircraft with automatic weapons fire. The aircraft crashed, inverted, and burst into flames. Capt. Young escaped through a window of the burning aircraft. Disregarding serious burns, Capt. Young aided one of the wounded men and attempted to lead the hostile forces away from his position. Later, despite intense pain from his burns, he declined to accept rescue because he had observed hostile forces setting up automatic weapons positions to entrap any rescue aircraft. For more than 17 hours he evaded the enemy until rescue aircraft could be brought into the area. Through his extraordinary heroism, aggressiveness, and concern for his fellow man, Capt. Young reflected the highest credit upon himself, the U.S. Air Force, and the Armed Forces of his country.

== See also ==
- List of Medal of Honor recipients for the Vietnam War
- Young's Park on Guemes Island, Washington is named after him.
