= Da Nang Air Base =

Military base in Vietnam

Da Nang Air Base
- Da Nang, South Central Coast in Vietnam
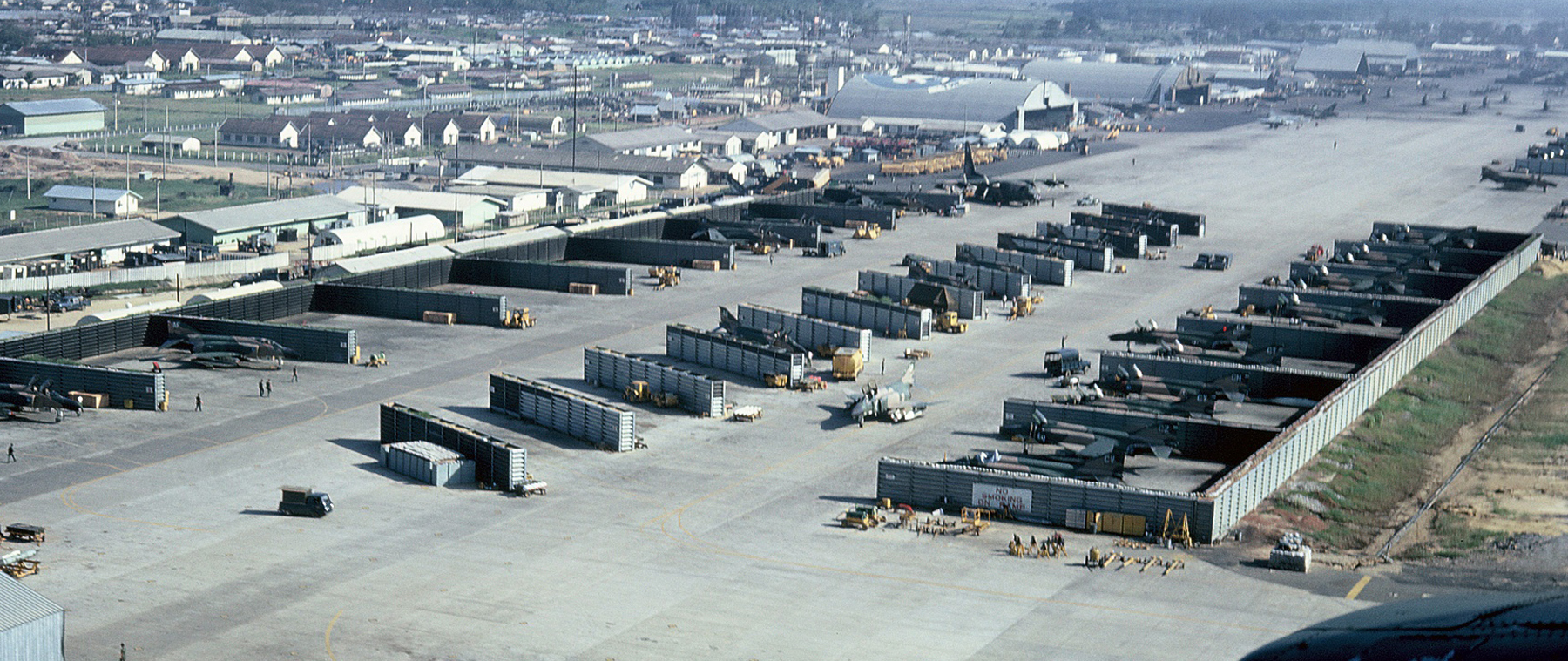
- Da Nang AB in the late 1960s

Site information
- Type: Air Force Base
- Operator: Army of the Republic of Vietnam (ARVN); United States Army (U.S. Army); Vietnam People's Air Force (VPAF); Republic of Vietnam Air Force (RVNAF); Pacific Air Forces (USAF)
- Condition: Renovated

Location
- Shown within Vietnam
- Coordinates: 16°02′38″N 108°11′58″E

Site history
- Built: 1930s
- In use: 1930s-
- Battles/wars: World War II; First Indochina War Vietnam War

Airfield information
- Identifiers: IATA: DAD, ICAO: VVDN
- Elevation: 33 feet (10 m) AMSL
Runways
Direction	Length and surface
17L/35R	11,483 feet (3,500 m) Asphalt
17R/35L	10,000 feet (3,048 m) Asphalt

Da Nang Air Base (Vietnamese: Căn cứ không quân Đà Nẵng) also known as Da Nang Airfield, Tourane Airfield or Tourane Air Base is a former French Air Force and later Republic of Vietnam Air Force (RVNAF) facility located in the city of Da Nang, Vietnam. During the Vietnam War (1959–1975), it was a major base with United States Army, United States Air Force (USAF), and United States Marine Corps (USMC) units stationed there. Air Vietnam also used the facility from 1951 to 1975 for civilian domestic and international flights within Southeast Asia.

== Early history ==
On 22 September 1940, the Vichy Government signed an agreement with Japan allowing the Japanese to station troops in Tonkin and use three airfields there. On 14 July 1941, the Japanese sent the French an ultimatum demanding the use of bases in Annam and Cochinchina, the French acquiesced and by late July, the Japanese occupied Cam Ranh Bay, Bien Hoa Air Base and Tourane Airfield.

In late 1944, the Fourteenth Air Force based in southern China began raiding Japanese bases throughout Indochina and on 12 January 1945, the United States Third Fleet launched attacks on Japanese coastal bases including Da Nang.

== Indochina War (1945–1954) ==
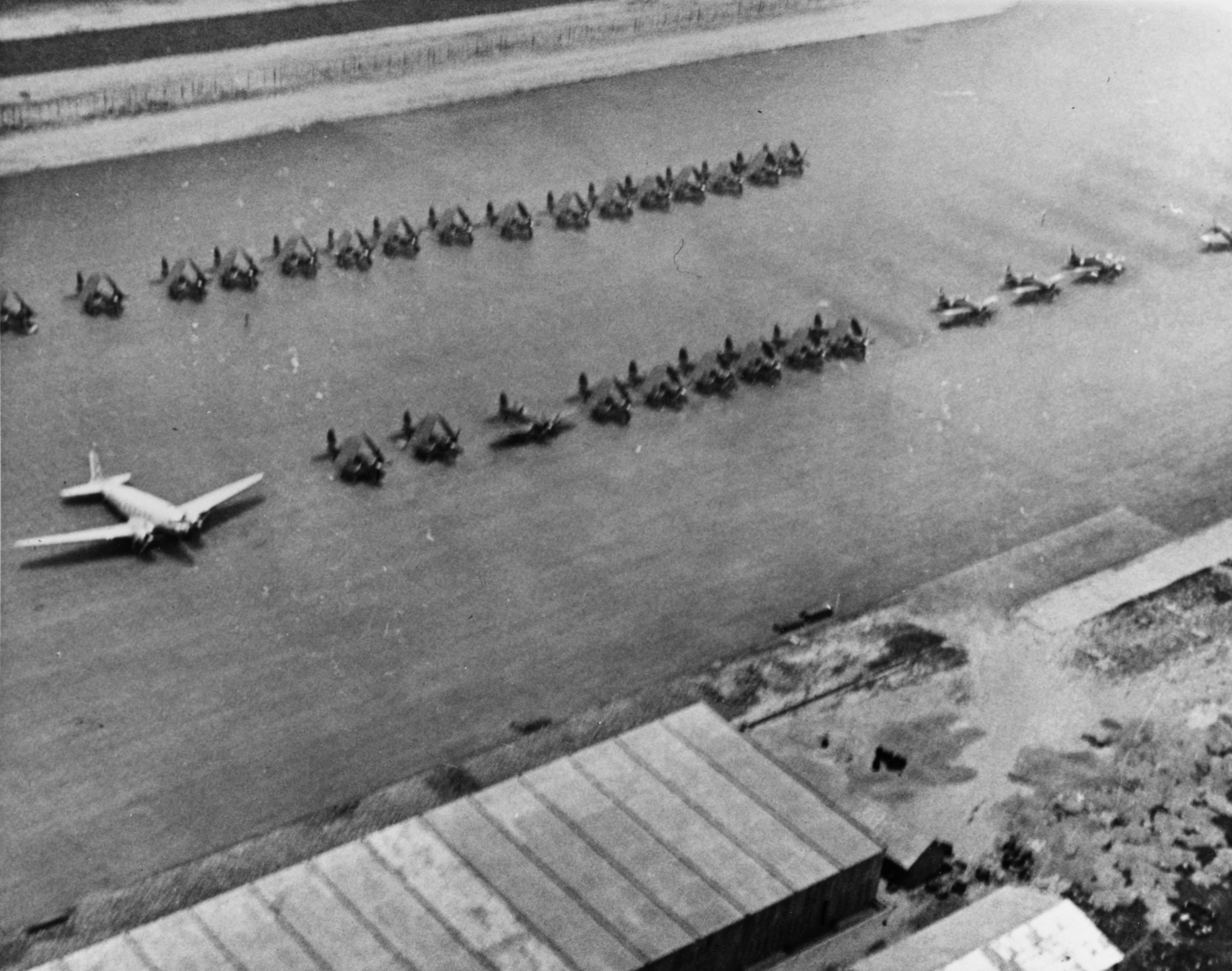
Tourane Airfield in 1954

Tourane Airfield was used by the French Air Force during the French Indochina War.

In December 1950, pursuant to the Mutual Defense Assistance Act and Program, the US delivered B-26 Invaders to the French and these were used to form the Bombardment Group I/19 Gascogne based at Tourane.

In 1953, the US Eighteenth Air Force C-119s were deployed to Tourane to support French military operations. A number of these aircraft crewed by civilians later flew in support of French forces in the Battle of Dien Bien Phu. In 1953/54 the French laid a NATO-standard 7,800-foot (2,400 m) asphalt runway at Tourane.

In January 1954, the USAF delivered a further 16 B-26s and 3 RB-26s to Tourane, and in February assigned USAF maintenance and supply personnel to Tourane on temporary duty to support B-26 operations. On 19 March the USAF deployed the 1808th Airways and Air Communications Service Squadron to Indochina with 60 enlisted men and one civilian at Tourane. On 6 April the USAF delivered 11 B-26s to Tourane for loan to the French. The USAF delivered 18 C-47s to Tourane on 9 April to replace aircraft losses. Later in April VMA-324 delivered 25 F4U/G Corsairs to the French Air Force at Tourane.

Following the French defeat at Dien Bien Phu and in anticipation of the Indochina peace treaty, on 23 May the USAF C-119 detachment at Cat Bi Air Base moved to Tourane.

On 14 June 1954 Viet Minh troops captured five USAF airmen of the 315th Air Division stationed at Tourane while they were on an unauthorized beach outing. They were held at a small camp about 60 miles (97 km) south of Tourane that was ringed by mines and pits with bamboo stakes. The airmen remained in captivity until 31 August when they were released to the French as part of a prisoner exchange.

On 19 July 1954 the USAF 6424th Air Depot Wing detachment that had supported French B–26 operations at Tourane completed its closeout and was inactivated.

On 6 September the last of the B-26s and C-119s on loan to the French departed from Tourane.

== Republic of Vietnam Air Force use (1955–1970) ==
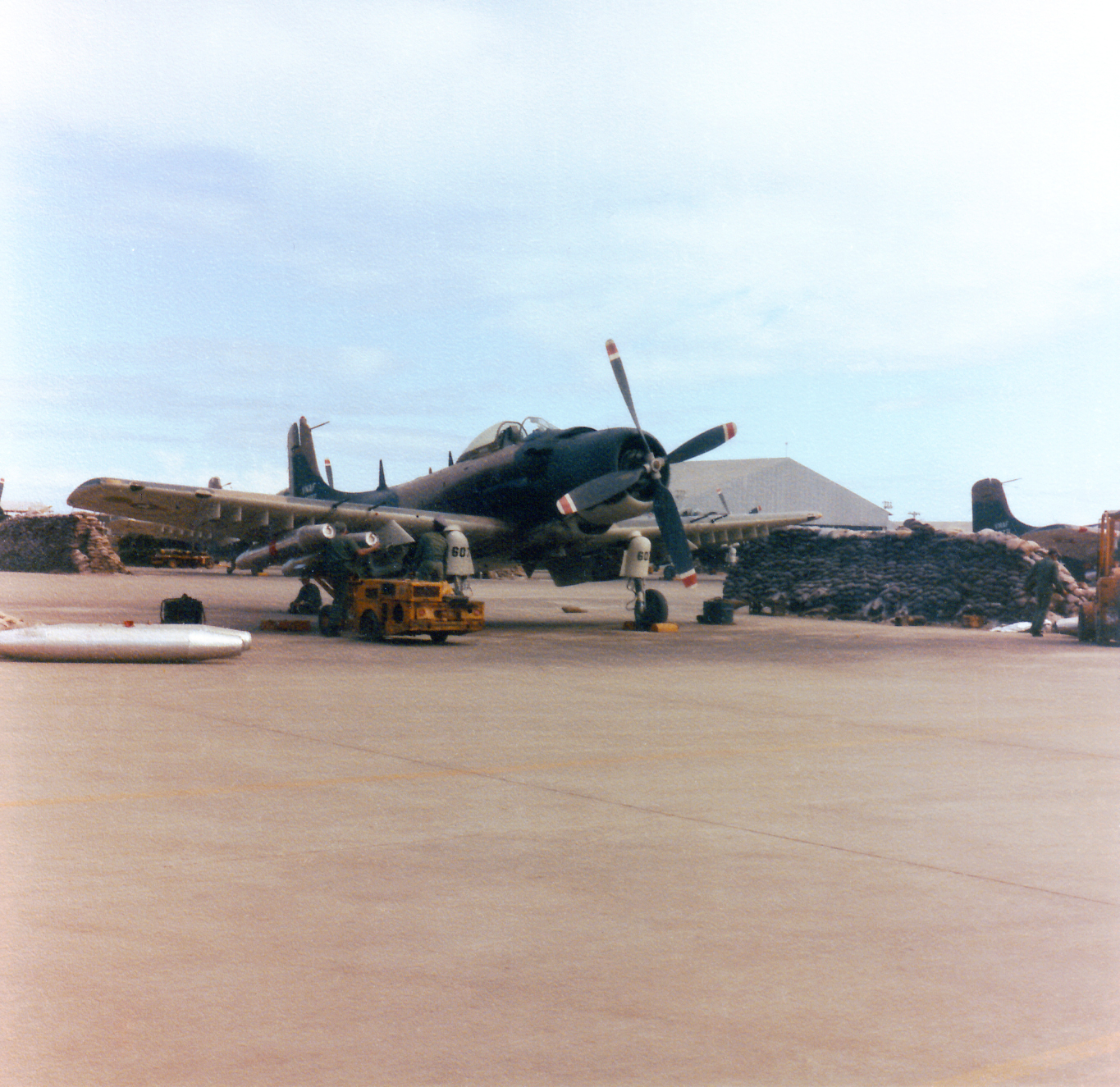
RVNAF A-1 at Da Nang AB in 1967

By the end of the Indochina War, the French had established a small Republic of Vietnam Air Force (RVNAF) consisting of 2 squadrons of Morane-Saulnier MS.500 and one of Morane-Saulnier MS.315. In January 1955, MAAG Vietnam decided that the RVNAF would comprise one fighter, two liaison and two transport squadrons and that training would be undertaken by the French. Under the Mutual Defence Assistance Program, the US delivered 28 F8Fs, 35 C-47s and 60 L-19s to the RVNAF to equip the planned expansion. On 19 September 1955 the French turned over Tourane Airfield to the RVNAF, at the time the base had a 7,850 feet (2,390 m) runway, with potential extension of at least 1,000 feet (300 m). On 1 June 1957 all RVNAF training responsibility passed from the French to the United States.

In November 1955, the RVNAF 1st Liaison Squadron moved to Da Nang AB from Huế.

In October 1961, the 2nd Helicopter Squadron was activated at Da Nang AB.

In December 1961 the 3rd Liaison Squadron was activated at Da Nang AB.

In mid-1962, the RVNAF 2nd Fighter Squadron equipped with T-28s became operational at Nha Trang Air Base and began detaching 6 aircraft to Da Nang AB.

In January 1963, the 2nd Helicopter Squadron was redesignated the 213th Helicopter Squadron, the 1st Liaison Squadron was redesignated the 110th Liaison Squadron and the 3rd Liaison Squadron was redesignated the 114th Liaison Squadron.

In February 1964, the 516th Fighter Squadron equipped with 15 A-1 Skyraiders moved to Da Nang AB from Nha Trang AB. On 15 March 1964 the RVNAF established a Tactical Wing Headquarters at the base. In May the 217th Helicopter Squadron was established at the base.

On 8 February 1965, RVNAF commander Nguyễn Cao Kỳ led VNAF A-1s from the base on a retaliatory raid against North Vietnamese targets.

On 2 March 1965, twenty A-1s from the base participated in the first attacks of Operation Rolling Thunder, striking the Vietnam People's Navy base at Quảng Khê. On 14 March the VNAF led by General Kỳ participated in attacks on barracks on Hòn Gió island.

In August 1965, four USAF B-57Bs operating from the base were nominally transferred to the RVNAF becoming their first jet aircraft.

In 1970, the RVNAF units at Da Nang AB were reorganized as the First Air Division with responsibility for Military Region I. Also during that year the RVNAF began building family housing at the base for its personnel.

== United States military use (1962–1972) ==
Da Nang Air Base was used as a primary entry point for American service members flying into Vietnam fighting in the Vietnam War. It was used by the United States Marine Corps (USMC) as well as the US Air force (USAF).

=== US Army use ===
From January 1962 until September the 93rd Transportation Company (Light Helicopter) with Piasecki CH-21C Shawnees was based here. During February the company was joined by the 339th Transportation Company (Direct Support). In September 1962, the CH-21's left and were replaced by HMM-362 with the 611th Transportation Company (Aircraft Direct Support).

In 1965, as a result of an Army study on future mortuary support, the Commander in Chief, Pacific directed that the mortuary mission be transferred to United States Army Vietnam effective 1 July 1966. On 20 June 1967 a stand-by mortuary at the base was placed in operation.

=== USAF use ===
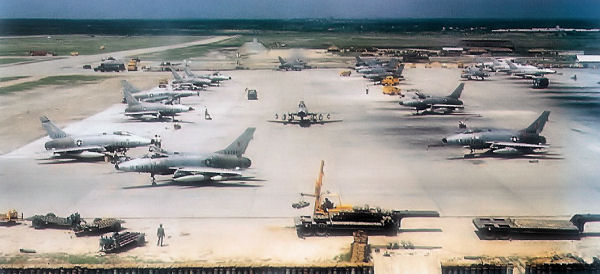
F-100Ds of the 416th Fighter Squadron at Da Nang AB in 1965

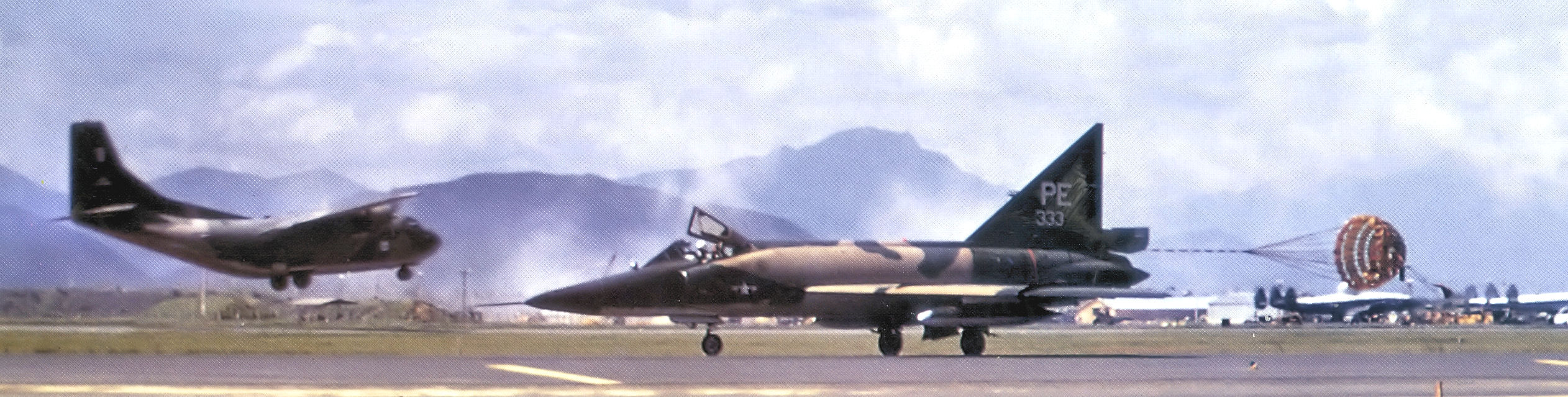
64th FIS F-102A landing at Da Nang AB, 1966

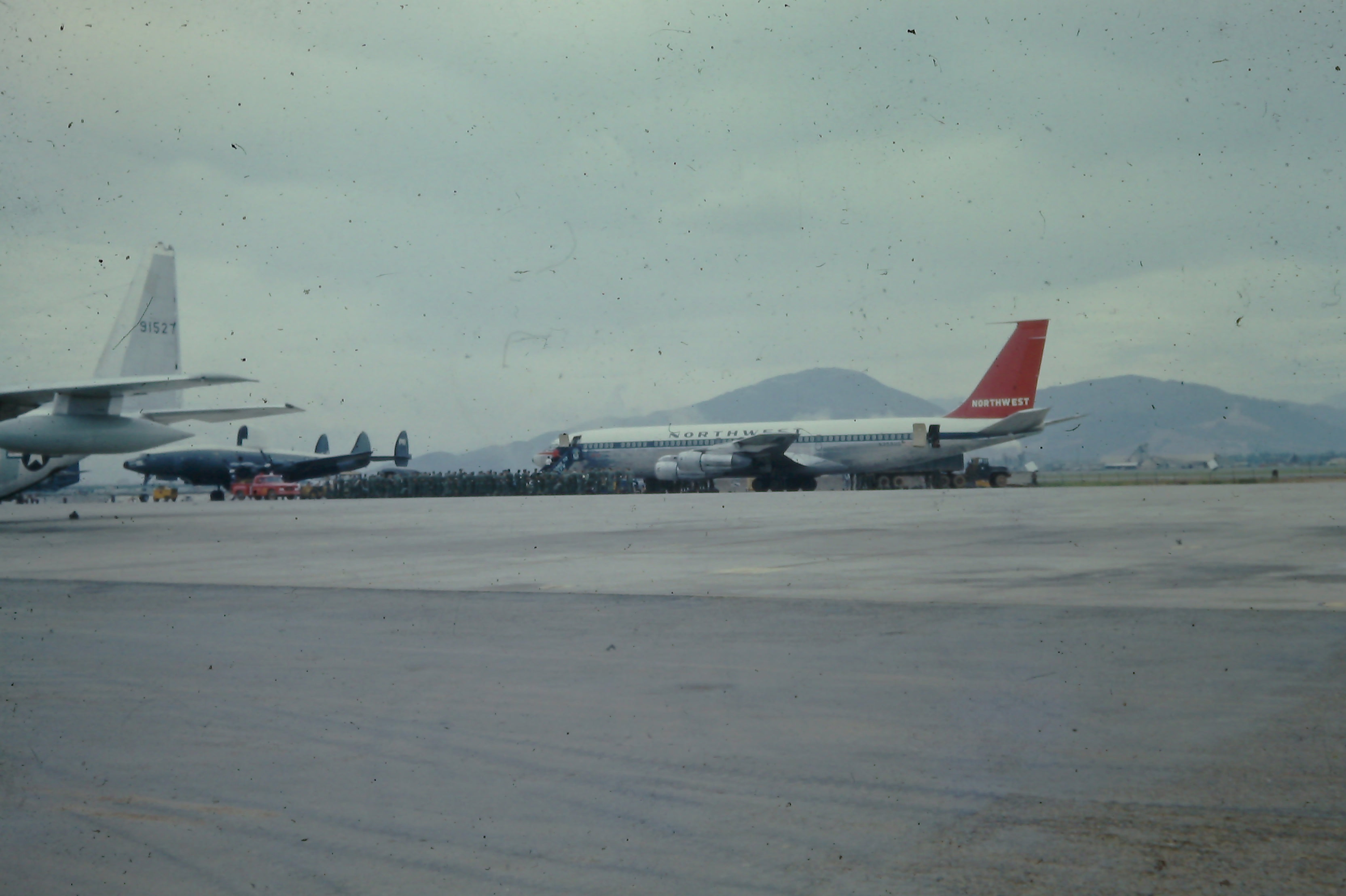
Northwest Airlines Boeing 707 at Da Nang AB in September 1966

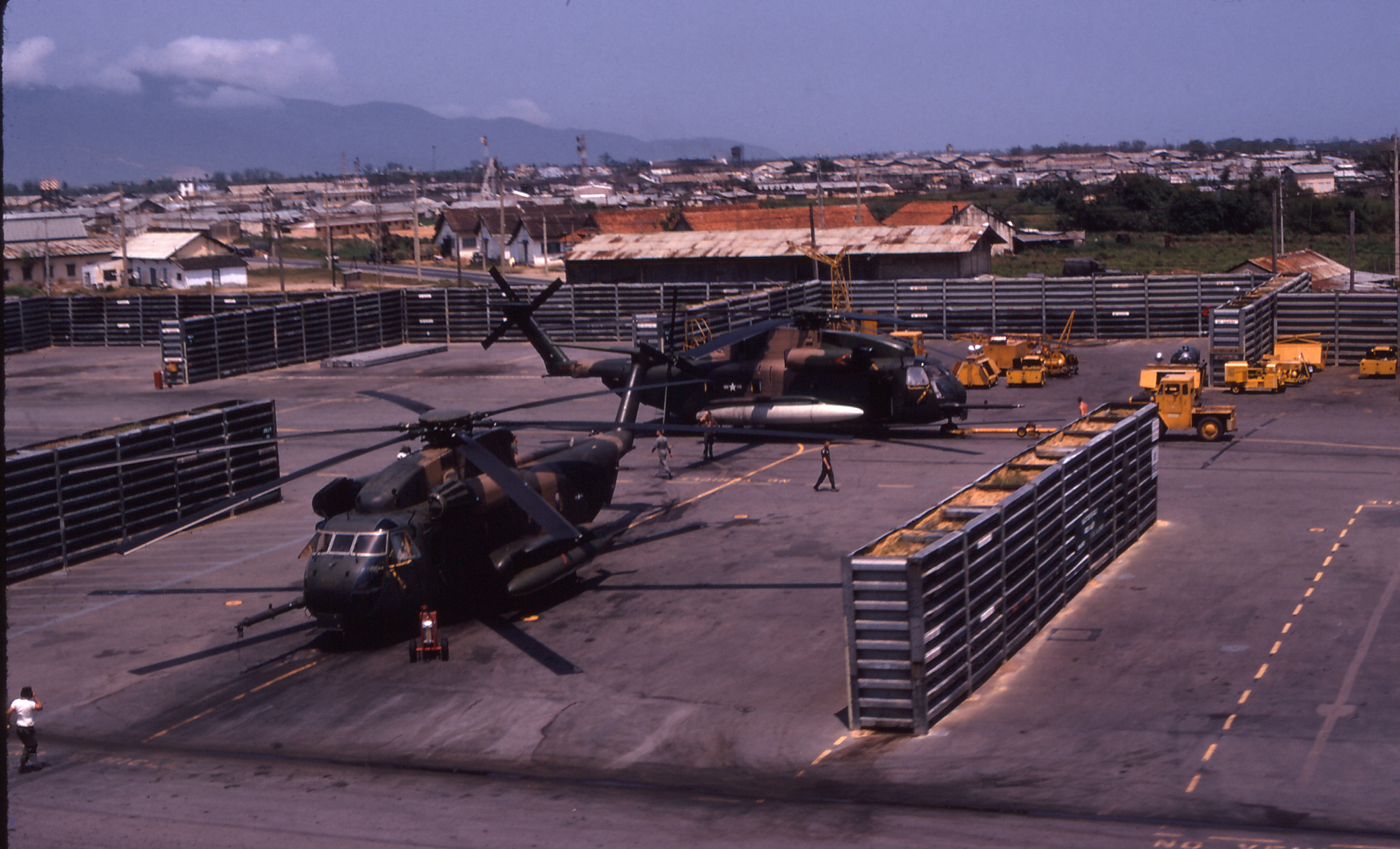
37th ARRS HH-53s at Da Nang AB c.1970

In January 1962, the USAF 5th Tactical Control Group was deployed to Da Nang AB to provide air support operations in I Corps. By 2 March C-123s were stationed at the base under Project Mule Train. On 20 May 1962 the 6222nd Air Base Squadron was formed at the base to support VNAF operations and the growing USAF presence through Farm Gate operations.

On 15 June 1962, 12 C-123s from the 777th Troop Carrier Squadron deployed to the base forming the Tactical Air Force Transport Squadron Provisional-2 to supplement the existing Mule Train operations and those of the US Army's 18th Fixed Wing Aviation Company equipped with U-1 Otters.

In early 1962, the base runway was asphalt covered and 7,900-foot (2,400 m) long while the taxiways and parking areas were covered in Pierced steel planking (PSP).

In April 1963, the 777th Troop Carrier Squadron equipped with 16 C-123s was transferred to the base and later that year the base's existing Mule Train operations were redesignated as the 311th Troop Carrier Squadron.

In early 1964, the U.S. Navy Officer in Charge of Construction RVN (OICC) directed the American construction contractor RMK-BRJ to rebuild and extend the existing runway to 10,000 ft (3,000 m), with new asphalt paving. This was completed in July 1964.

On 5 August 1964, following the Gulf of Tonkin incident, 6 F-102s from the 509th Fighter Squadron and 8 F-100s from the 615th Tactical Fighter Squadron (615th TFS) deployed to Da Nang AB from Clark Air Base in the Philippines. The F-100s were proposed to be used for a strike against the Vietnam People's Air Force (VPAF) Phúc Yên Air Base as part of the US response to the incident, however approval for the strike was denied.

Commencing in December 1964, Da Nang AB was used to support Operation Barrel Roll, the covert air war in neighbouring Laos. On 14 December F-105s from the 80th Tactical Fighter Squadron based at Korat Royal Thai Air Force Base, Thailand staged through Da Nang for the initial strikes supported by the base's F-100s. Later that month F-105s from the 44th Tactical Fighter Squadron deployed to the base for further strikes near Tchepone, these aircraft would form Detachment 2 18th Tactical Fighter Wing. Also in December the 613th Tactical Fighter Squadron deployed to the base.

In February 1965, 12 F-100s from the 3rd Tactical Fighter Wing deployed to the base to support the Operation Flaming Dart airstrikes.

On 2 March 1965, F-100s, F-105s and VNAF A-1s from the base participated in the first attacks of Operation Rolling Thunder, striking the naval base at Quảng Khê, losing 2 F-100s in the attack.

By March 1965, with the base overcrowded by the arrival of new squadrons, a major expansion was approved. In August 1965, the OICC directed RMK-BRJ to construct a second 10,000-foot (3,000 m) parallel runway and paved taxiways and parking areas. The second runway opened in July 1966.

In March 1965, the 35th Tactical Fighter Wing (35th TFW) deployed to the base.In April the 615th Tactical Fighter Squadron deployed to the base. The 416th Tactical Fighter Squadron deployed to the base before moving to Bien Hoa AB in mid-May. Also in April the 476th Tactical Fighter Squadron (476th TFS) equipped with F-104Cs was deployed to the base. In May the 20th Tactical Air Support Squadron (20th TASS) equipped with O-1s deployed to the base. In June the 615th TFS returned to the US. In mid-June the 8th Bombardment Squadron equipped with B-57Bs moved to the base from Bien Hoa, these would be rotated with other B-57s from the 13th Bombardment Squadron until September 1966 when they would be moved to Phan Rang Air Base.

On the early morning of 1 July 1965, the PAVN and Vietcong launched a mortar and sapper attack on the base, destroying one F-102 and two C-130s and damaging a further two F-102s and one C-130. The PAVN/VC had killed a guard undetected and then used his unsecured telephone to divert US troops to the far side of the base.

In July, the 436th Tactical Fighter Squadron (436th TFS) replaced the 476th TFS. In October the 435th Tactical Fighter Squadron replaced the 436th TFS. In November the 390th Tactical Fighter Squadron (390th TFS) equipped with F-4s deployed to the base.

The 1972d Communications Squadron was designated and organized at Da Nang Airport on 20 August 1965, as part of the 1964th Communications Group, Air Force Communications Service.

On 1 January 1966, the 4503rd Tactical Fighter Squadron equipped with the F-5A Skoshi Tiger moved to the base for trial operations over North Vietnam and Laos. The F-5s returned to Bien Hoa in early February and returned to Da Nang AB from 20 February to 10 March when they returned again to Bien Hoa and were redesignated as the 10th Fighter Squadron.

On 8 January 1966, the 37th Aerospace Rescue and Recovery Squadron (37th ARRS) was activated at Da Nang AB operating 5 HU-16s on loan from the 31st ARRS and the 33rd ARRS, the squadron was responsible for aircrew recovery over North Vietnam, Laos and the Gulf of Tonkin. In May 1967, Detachment 1 38th ARRS operating HH-3s at the base was reassigned to the 37th ARRS.

In February 1966, the 480th Fighter Squadron deployed to the base. In July Detachment 3, 405th Fighter Wing equipped with F-102s deployed to the base.

In April/May 1966, following civil unrest in Da Nang, all USAF personnel were moved from off-base housing into barracks on the base.

In May 1966, the base supported Operation Carolina Moon an unsuccessful attempt to destroy the Thanh Hóa Bridge with mines dropped from C-130s.

By September 1966, the 20th TASS had replaced most of its O-1s with the O-2A with many of these forward deployed to smaller bases close to the DMZ.

In October, the 366th Tactical Fighter Wing deployed to the base from Phan Rang replacing the 35th TFW which moved down to Phan Rang. By December 1966 7 F-4 squadrons were operating from the base.

In March 1967, elements of the 9th Air Commando Squadron equipped with O-2Bs began operating from the base.

During the Tet Offensive attacks in northern I Corps, many of the detached 20th TASS units returned from their forward bases to the security of Da Nang AB, resulting in longer transit and reduced on-station times for their forward air control missions.

On 20 September 1969 a USAF F-4 returning from a strike mission collided with an Air Vietnam Douglas C-54D-10-DC Skymaster (registration XV-NUG) 3 km (1.6 nmi; 1.9 mi) northwest of the airport, taking off part of the C-54's wing, the C-54 crashed into a plowed field, killing 74 of the 75 people on board and two people working in the field.

On 8 April 1970, the PAVN shelled and rocketed the base killing one Airman and one Marine and damaging barracks and communications facilities.

(AFCS G-73, 18 May 1965, amended by G-105, 4 August 1965);

By 1972, with Vietnamization at an advanced stage, Da Nang AB was one of only four major USAF bases remaining in South Vietnam with the 366th TFW based there. When the Easter Offensive began on 30 March 1972 the USAF moved quickly to build up its tactical fighter strength in Vietnam, on 3 April 9 F-4s were deployed to Da Nang AB as part of Operation Commando Fly, these aircraft were soon joined by an additional 9 F-4s and formed the 35th Tactical Fighter Squadron (35th TFS).

On 9 April, a Boeing B-52 Stratofortress made an emergency landing at the base after a hit by an SA-2 missile over the Vietnamese Demilitarised Zone. On 24 April another B-52 made an emergency landing at the base after an SA-2 knocked out three of its engines over North Vietnam.

In late May, the 366th TFW began moving from Da Nang AB to Takhli Royal Thai Air Force Base, with the personnel of the 390th TFS returning to the US while their aircraft were transferred to other squadrons in Thailand. The 35th TFS redeployed to Udorn Royal Thai Air Force Base.

On 13 March 1973 the 1972d Communications Squadron at the base was reassigned and moved to Eglin Air Force Base, Florida.

=== USMC use ===
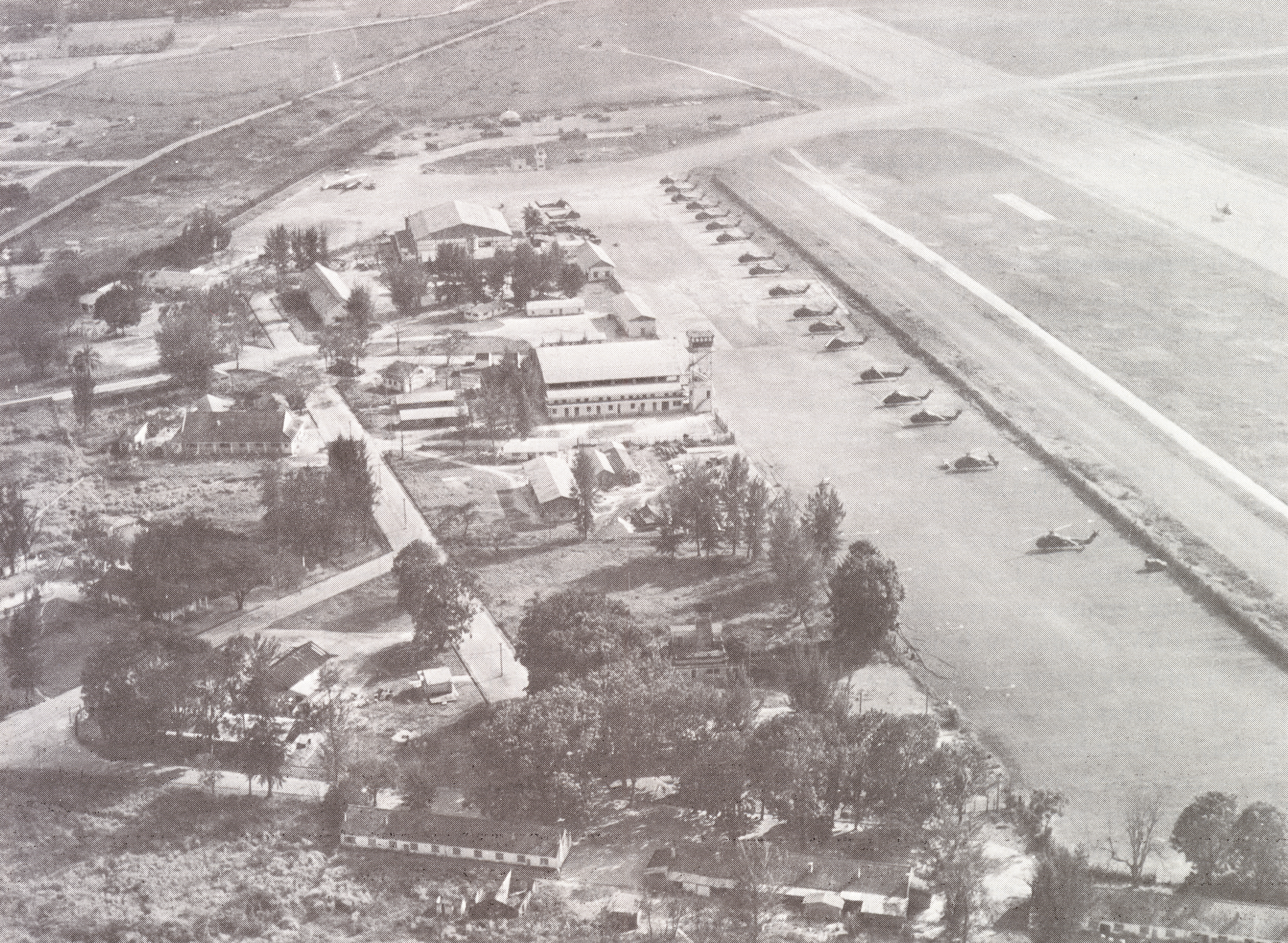
SHUFLY UH-34s of HMM-163 at Da Nang AB in September 1962

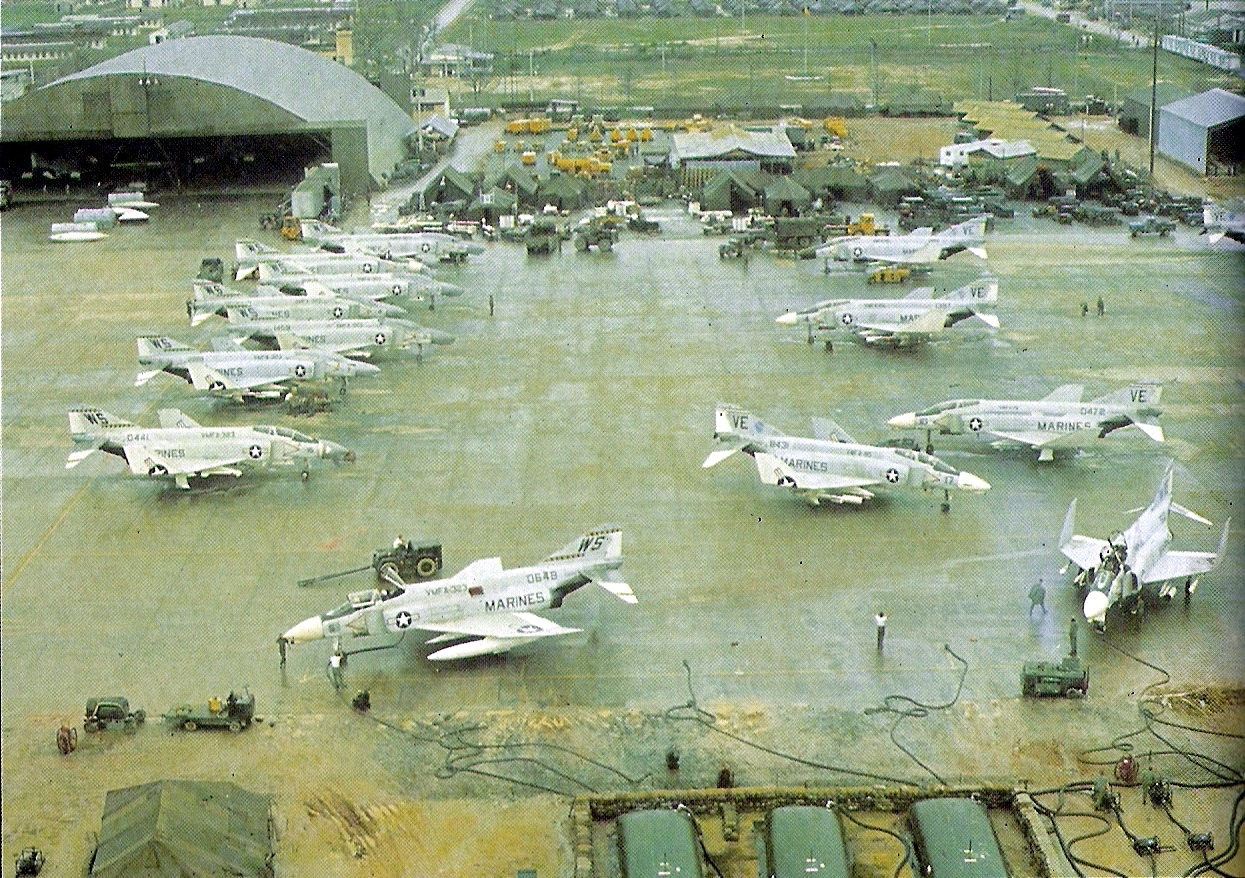
F-4Bs of VMFA-115 at Da Nang AB in January 1966

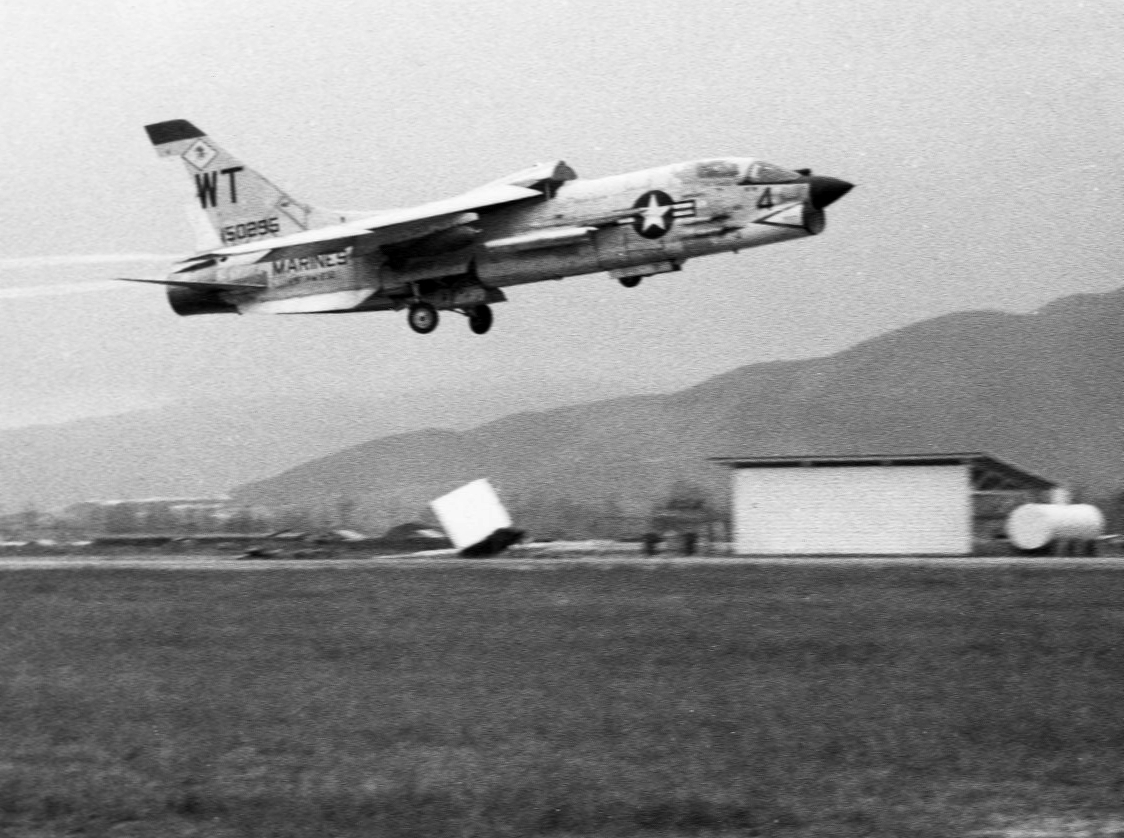
F-8E of VMF(AW)-232 taking off from Da Nang AB c.1967

In early September 1962, HMM-163 codenamed Operation Shufly, one of the first United States Marine Corps (USMC) helicopter units to serve in Vietnam, was redeployed with its support units from Marine Aircraft Group 16 (MABS-16) from Sóc Trăng Airfield to Da Nang Airfield, completing the redeployment by 20 September. HMM-162 was tasked with supporting ARVN operations in I Corps, and conducted their first combat operation deploying units from the ARVN 2nd Division on 18 September 1962.

The ARVN, RVNAF, USAF and USMC established a joint Air Support Operations Center at Da Nang AB to coordinate air support within I Corps. This was later supplemented by an Aviation Headquarters Operations Centre to oversee Army and USMC aviation.

On 11 January 1963, HMM-162 replaced HMM-163 at Da Nang AB and in April a reconnaissance platoon from the 3rd Marine Division was deployed to provide base security. Later in April the US Army's 68th Aviation Company equipped with armed UH-1Bs began operations from the base. On 8 June 1963 HMM-261 replaced HMM-162. On 2 October HMM-361 replaced HMM-261.

On 1 February 1964, HMM-364 replaced HMM-361 at Da Nang AB, together with its combat support missions HMM-364 was tasked with training VNAF personnel in helicopter operations as it was intended that they would be the last USMC helicopter unit deployed to Vietnam and would depart by 30 June. Following harassment attacks on the Marine compound, on 24 March a platoon from 1st Battalion 9th Marines was deployed to Da Nang AB to increase base security. By late May it had become clear that the 30 June departure date was unrealistic and so in late June HMM-364 turned over their helicopters to the new VNAF 217th Squadron, HMM-162 returned to Da Nang. On 21 September the USMC evacuated Da Nang AB as Typhoon Tilda approached, the Marines returned to their damaged base on 23 September. On 29 September 1/9 Marines was replaced by a platoon from Company E 2nd Battalion 9th Marines. In early October HMM-162 was replaced by HMM-365. On 26 November E/2/9 Marines was replaced by the reinforced Company L 3rd Battalion 9th Marines.

On 7 February 1965, following the Attack on Camp Holloway, US President Lyndon B. Johnson ordered retaliatory airstrikes against North Vietnam and the deployment of HAWK missiles to South Vietnam to defend against any attacks by the VPAF. The USMC 1st Light Antiaircraft Missile Battalion based on Okinawa was ordered to deploy to Da Nang. Arriving by C-130 on 8 February, two of 1st LAAM's HAWK batteries were fully operational by February 18.

On 8 March 1965, in coordination with the amphibious landing of the 9th Marine Regiment at Red Beach north of Da Nang, the 1st Battalion 3rd Marines landed at Da Nang AB from Naha Air Base, this marked the first deployment of US combat troops to South Vietnam. On 9 March HMM-365 was replaced by HMM-162. The 9th Marine Expeditionary Brigade (9th MEB) were tasked with defending Da Nang AB, while overall responsibility for defending the Da Nang area remained with the ARVN, SHUFLY was absorbed into Marine Aircraft Group 16 (MAG-16), part of 9th MEB.

On 10 April, F-4Bs from VMFA-531 landed at Da Nang AB, this would be the first USMC fighter-bomber squadron deployed to Vietnam. On 16 April Marine Air Support Squadron 2 (MASS-2) was deployed to Da Nang AB to provide tactical air control for Marine aviation units and the following day VMCJ-1 equipped with EF-10Bs deployed to the base. The USMC fixed wing units were designated Marine Aircraft Group 11 (MAG-11).

In early May 1965, the 9th MEB was redesignated as the 3rd Marine Amphibious Force (III MAF) and a 1st Marine Aircraft Wing (1st MAW) advanced headquarters was established at Da Nang AB. III MAF and 1st MAW controlled all USMC units in Vietnam which now comprised the enclaves at Da Nang, Chu Lai Base Area and Phu Bai Combat Base.

In mid-July, VMFA-513 relieved VMFA-531 and VMFA-542 was also deployed to Da Nang AB. On 7 August given the overcrowding at the base, the helicopters of MAG-16 moved to the new Marble Mountain Air Facility, on the Tiensha Peninsula across the Da Nang River from Da Nang AB.

On 15 October, VMFA-115 replaced VMFA-513, on 1 December VMFA-323 replaced VMFA-542 and on 19 December VMF(AW)-312 deployed to the base. A detachment of four KC-130 tankers from VMGR-152 was also stationed at Da Nang AB to support USMC squadrons.

On 25 January 1966, the Vietcong attacked Da Nang AB with 120mm mortars killing one Marine.

In late 1966, VMF (AW)-242 equipped with A-6As was deployed to Da Nang AB.

On 27 February 1967, the PAVN launched a rocket attack hitting the base with more than 50 140mm rockets in one minute, a further rocket attack took place on 15 March. On 14 July the PAVN launched another rocket attack firing over 50 122mm rockets destroying 10 aircraft, barracks and a bomb dump, damaging a further 40 aircraft and killing 8 Americans and wounding 176.

On the morning of 3 January 1968, the Vietcong launched more than 50 122mm rockets at the base destroying a Marine F-4B and two USAF aircraft and damaging 17 others.

At the beginning of 1968, USMC units at Da Nang AB included VMCJ-1, VMF (AW)-235, VMF (AW)-242 and VMFA-122. During the Tet Offensive together with other attacks on US and ARVN facilities in the Da Nang area, on the night of 29 January the Vietcong fired rockets at the base and then at 02:30 on 30 January they launched a sapper and mortar attack on the south of the base killing 4 Marines. At 03:30 a renewed rocket attack on the base began with 55 122mm rockets hitting within 20 minutes killing 3 Marines and wounding 11 and destroying 5 aircraft and damaging a further 14.

In January 1969, USMC units at Da Nang AB included VMCJ-1, VMF (AW)-242, VMFA-334 and VMFA-542. On 23 February 1969 as part of the Tet 1969 attacks, a PAVN rocket attack destroyed a 450,000 gallon fuel tank beside the base and damaged an A-6. On 7 October as part of Operation Keystone Cardinal, a farewell ceremony took place at the base to mark the departure of the 3rd Marine Division from South Vietnam.

At the beginning of 1970, USMC units at Da Nang AB included VMCJ-1, VMF (AW)-225, VMF (AW)-242 and VMFA-542. In late January 1970 as part of Operation Keystone Bluejay VMFA-542 departed Vietnam and VMO-2 moved to the base from Marble Mountain Air Facility. In July–August as part of Operation Keystone Robin Alpha, VMCJ-1 and VMF (AW)-242 departed Vietnam while the withdrawal of Marine Aircraft Group 13 from Chu Lai Air Base saw the relocation of VMFA-115 and VMA-311 to Da Nang AB as part of MAG-11. During 1970 Marine engineers constructed 170 "Wonderarch" concrete and steel aircraft protection shelters at Da Nang AB and Marble Mountain Air Facility.

Beginning in January 1971, as part of Operation Keystone Robin Charlie the 1st MAW headquarters and VMFA-115 departed Da Nang AB for MCAS Iwakuni while VMO-2 returned to the US, leaving MAG-11 with two squadrons, VMF (AW)-225 and VMA-311 and other assorted assets, by 22 June 1971 all USMC aviation units had left South Vietnam.

On 31 January 1971, 8 PAVN rockets hit the base igniting a 50,000 gallon fuel tank and damaging two KC-130s. On 21 February another rocket attack destroyed a C-130.

On 6 April 1972, USMC squadrons returned to Da Nang AB to confront the PAVN Easter Offensive, with VMFA-115 and VMFA-232 redeploying to the base under the command of Marine Aircraft Group 15 (MAG-15). On 12 April the base was hit by 122mm rockets killing 14 Vietnamese civilians. On 14 April VMFA-212 arrived at the base followed the next day by H&MS-15. On 24 April the base was hit by PAVN 122mm rockets, prompting a call for Marines to provide base security, and on 25 May the 3rd Battalion 9th Marines was deployed to the base. From 16 June, MAG-15 began moving to Royal Thai Air Base Nam Phong, while USMC operations at Da Nang AB were reduced to rearming and refueling. On 18 August 1972 the PAVN fired 43 rockets at the base, hitting the base and adjacent housing and killing 27 South Vietnamese civilians and one U.S. airman, wounding 24 civilians and 21 U.S. airmen and destroying two aircraft with ten damaged. On 8 January 1973, five U.S. jets accidentally bombed the base destroying three fuel tanks, damaging seven aircraft and injuring ten Americans and one South Vietnamese. On 26 January 1973, the date before the Paris Peace Accords were to come into effect, two MAG-15 F-4s were damaged by PAVN rocket fire as they rearmed at Danang AB.

== Capture of Da Nang Air Base (1975) ==
On 11 March 1975, faced with the PAVN invasion and the collapse of the South Vietnamese positions in the Central Highlands, President Nguyen Van Thieu decided on a new strategy of "light at the top, heavy on the bottom" which essentially involved only defending III Corps and IV Corps, with the ARVN withdrawing from I Corps and II Corps as necessary in the face of PAVN pressure. Thieu met with Lieutenant General Ngô Quang Trưởng in Saigon on 13 March and Trưởng understood that he was authorised to concentrate his forces around Da Nang. On 19 March Trưởng presented Thieu with alternative plans for the simultaneous withdrawal by road from Huế, Chu Lai and Qui Nhơn to Da Nang or if the road was cut by the PAVN for withdrawal of forces into enclaves at Huế, Chu Lai and Qui Nhơn and then their evacuation by sea. Thieu agreed that Trưởng should attempt to hold Huế despite misgivings as to the ARVN's ability to hold the city and the navy's ability to supply them. Trưởng returned to Da Nang to reorganise his forces for the defense of Huế but was immediately confronted with a PAVN frontal assault against Quảng Trị Province and the ARVN soon retreated towards Huế. On 21 March the PAVN launched attacks south of Huế aimed at isolating the city and preventing the reinforcement or withdrawal or ARVN forces into the city and establishment of defensive lines. On 22 March Thieu ordered the withdrawal of all ARVN forces between Huế and Da Nang to fall back into an enclave at Da Nang.

By 26 March, Huế and all of Quảng Trị, Thừa Thiên, Quảng Nam and Quảng Ngãi Provinces had been captured by the PAVN and Da Nang was isolated. Trưởng organised his remaining forces, which numbered approximately 75,000 troops, into inner and outer defensive lines around the city, while the PAVN prepared to attack the city from four directions before its defenses could be properly established. Trưởng's defense plans were hampered by the presence of 1–1,500,000 refugees and ARVN stragglers who had crowded the city. Throughout 26 March, evacuation flights by Air America, Air Vietnam, the RVNAF and World Airways from Da Nang AB took place but could not keep up with the vast tide of refugees. On 27 March, the situation at Da Nang AB was becoming increasingly chaotic as panicked refugees surged to board a World Airways flight and began mobbing the other flights, with groups of refugees gathering on the taxiways and runways. By the evening of 27 March all evacuation flights out of the base were stopped, but propeller aircraft continued to evacuate refugees from Marble Mountain Air Facility. That night, General Lanh, Deputy Commander of the RVNAF, flew into the base and instructed General Khanh of RVNAF 1st Air Division to evacuate all flyable aircraft. 130 aircraft would be evacuated while some 180, including 33 A-37s, were abandoned.

The PAVN attack began on the morning of 28 March with an artillery barrage on the city. Probing attacks quickly penetrated the ARVN defenses, and the fragile ARVN discipline collapsed as soldiers began to desert their positions and seek refuge for themselves and their families. On the night of 28 March, Trưởng received intelligence that an all-out PAVN assault against the city would commence the next morning; he decided to abandon Da Nang, and ordered his forces to move to beaches for evacuation by sea.

On the morning of 29 March, two World Airways Boeing 727s flew from Saigon to Da Nang to attempt to pick up more refugees. When the first 727 landed at Da Nang AB it was mobbed as 270 people pushed into the plane; all but three were ARVN. As the aircraft attempted to take off, it was hit by a grenade which jammed the flaps. The main runway was blocked by trucks, and the pilot was forced to take off from a taxiway. A number of ARVN soldiers hung onto the undercarriage and in the wheel wells, preventing the retraction of the landing gear; four of them survived the flight back to Saigon.

The PAVN entered the outskirts of Da Nang by mid-morning on 29 March, and were in complete control of the city by the afternoon. At Da Nang AB the PAVN captured 10,000 tons of air munitions worth $18 million, various ground radar equipment and 176 aircraft, including an F-5E, 5 F-5As, 24 A-37s and 80 UH-ls.

On 7 April the first VPAF transport aircraft began landing at Da Nang AB to support PAVN operations further south. In mid-April the VPAF formed the Quyet Thang ("Determined to Win") Squadron at Da Nang AB and began preliminary training of pilots on captured RVNAF A-37s. The squadron would carry out the bombing of Tan Son Nhut Air Base on 28 April.

== Accidents and incidents ==
- On 16 March 1970 a U.S. Navy EC-121 Warning Star #145927 of VQ-1 crashed on landing. The aircraft struck a hangar and caught fire killing 22 of the 28-man crew.
