= USCGC Acacia =

USCGC Acacia can refer to the following ships of the United States Coast Guard:

- USCGC Acacia (WAGL-200), a former United States Army mine planter constructed in 1919. The vessel was acquired by the United States Coast Guard through the U.S. Lighthouse Service and converted to a lighthouse tender. The vessel was sunk in 1942 by a German U-boat.
- USCGC Acacia (WLB-406), constructed for the United States Coast Guard in 1944 as a buoy tender. The vessel was taken out of service in 2006.
