= USCGC Tupelo =

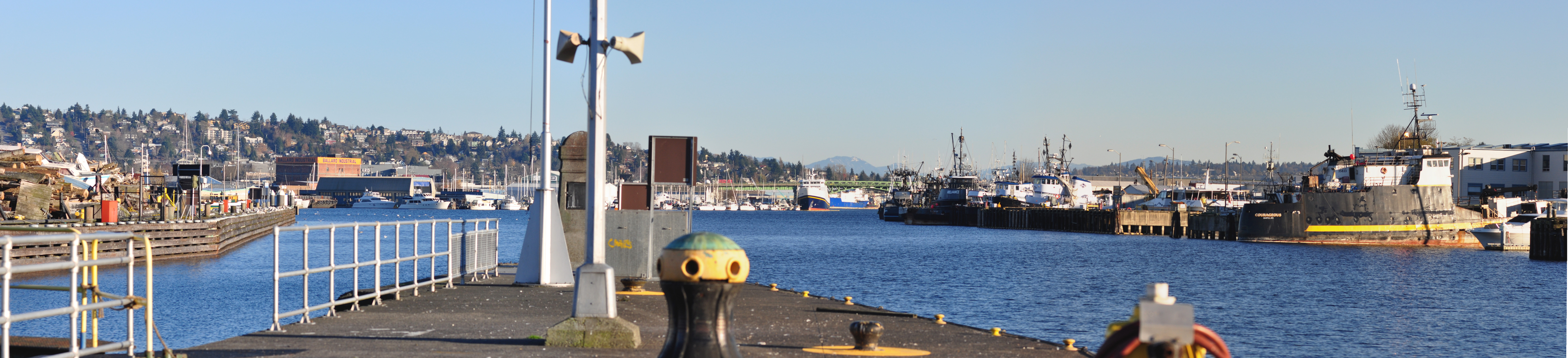
- Courageous (far right) docked in Seattle, November 2015

History

United States
- Name: USCGC Tupelo (WAGL/WLB-303)
- Namesake: Tupelo
- Builder: Zenith Dredge Company, Duluth, Minnesota
- Cost: $948,887.00 (US Dollars)
- Laid down: 15 August 1942
- Launched: 28 November 1942
- Commissioned: 30 August 1943
- Decommissioned: 30 September 1975
- Refit: Todd Shipyards, Seattle, Washington (beginning in October 1971)
- Homeport: Toledo, Ohio (1946-1969); Astoria, Oregon (1969-1975)
- Identification: Callsign: NPRU
- Fate: Sold, 13 September 1977

United States
- Name: Courageous
- Owner: Akulurak, LLC
- Acquired: 1977
- Homeport: Seattle, Washington
- Identification: IMO number: 7947398; MMSI number: 368499000; Callsign: WBC5659
- Status: In service
- Notes: Converted into fishing vessel between 1977-1979

General characteristics
- Class & type: Cactus or A class large buoy tender.
- Type: Coast Guard, Auxiliary, General, buoy tender, Large WAGL (1942). Coast Guard, Large, Buoy tender WLB (1965).
- Displacement: 1000 tons.
- Length: 180 feet.
- Beam: 37 feet.
- Draft: 12 feet, 6 inches.
- Ice class: Notched forefoot, ice belt at water line and reinforced bow.
- Installed power: 1 screw, 1000 SHP.
- Propulsion: 1 electric motor connected to 2 Westinghouse generators, driven by 2 Cooper-Bessemer type GND-8, 8 cylinder, 4 cycle diesels.
- Speed: Maximum: 11.5 knots. Economic: 10 knots (1973).
- Range: Maximum: 3940 miles. Economic: 6259 miles (1973).
- Boats & landing craft carried: 2 to 4 lifeboats, 1 of which was an LCVP.
- Capacity: Fuel: 29,000 US gallons diesel.
- Complement: 50.
- Sensors & processing systems: Radar: SL. Sonar: WEA-2.
- Armament: 1 3"/50 caliber gun (single mount), 2 20 mm Oerlikon/80 (single mount); 2 depth charge tracks; 2 Mousetraps; 4 Y-guns (1942). Post WW2: M2 Browning machine guns, M60 Machine guns, and small arms, were retained for law enforcement purposes.
- Notes: Outfitted with a 20 ton electric boom.

USCGC Tupelo WAGL/WLB-303, was a Cactus (A) Class 180-foot buoy tender vessel built by Zenith Dredge Company of Duluth, Minnesota. Her keel was laid 15 August 1942, launched on 28th November, 1942 and commissioned on 30 August 1943. She was built as a WAGL and redesignated a WLB in 1965.

== Ship's history ==
In the spring of 1943 Tupelo serviced aids to navigation (ATON), did search and recovery work near Norfolk, Virginia and broke ice in Chesapeake Bay. Tupelo was refitted as a Navy Damage Control Ship at the United States Coast Guard Yard Baltimore, Maryland in 1943. En route to fight in the Pacific War, via the Panama Canal, Tupelo went to the aid of the seagoing tugboat MV Atengo, which was in peril off the western coast of Mexico in a hurricane. During the rescue a crewman of Atengo had his hand mangled in an accident. Tupelo's surgeon treated the man and had to amputate his thumb. Tupelo was at Kwajalein Atoll next, en route to Guam with a convoy of Landing Craft Infantry (LCIs) . In 1944 she took tow of USS Oregon (BB-3) from a U.S. Navy seagoing tug, the Oregon was then a hulk to be used as a dynamite barge in Guam. Tupelo towed Oregon 100 miles to Guam. Upon arrival in Guam, which was still held by the Japanese Tupelo received her baptism under fire, while the U.S. fleet shelled the island. Tupelo's crew blasted a channel in the reef on the south side of Guam to accept Oregon's draft. Oregon was loaded with 1500 tons of 40 percent gelatin dynamite. From 1944 to 1946 Tupelo was assigned to Service Squadron 4, the "Harbor Stretchers", U.S. Pacific Fleet, and served there establishing and maintaining over 50 massive moorings for U.S. Navy ships with 15 ton anchors and 2-1/2 inch chain. She was also used to set buoys around minefields and to transport tons of dynamite to U.S. forces throughout the Pacific Islands. Tupelo was also responsible for maintaining Aids to Navigation (ATON) at Guam.

Following the war, on 1 July 1946 Tupelo was reassigned to Toledo, Ohio for maintaining Aids to Navigation, search and rescue, law enforcement and ice breaking on Lake Erie. On 25 June 1950 she patrolled the Mills Trophy Race off Kelleys Island, Ohio. On 27 November 1950 she assisted the tug MV Whitney and two scows 1.5 miles off of Toledo, Ohio. From 9 through 11 January 1951 she escorted the disabled tugboat MV Sherman H. Serre from Erie, Pennsylvania to Cleveland, Ohio. On 24 June 1951 she once again patrolled the Mills Trophy Race at Kelleys Island, Ohio. On 20 October 1951 she assisted MV George F. Rand off of Port Huron, Michigan. During 13–14 December 1951 she searched for but did not find a missing Cessna aircraft in western Lake Erie. On 11 September 1952 she assisted grounded MV Kulas and MV Fink in the Livingstone Channel.

From 23 to 25 September 1952 Tupelo searched for but did not find an overdue pleasure craft (PC) in western Lake Erie. On 21 April 1953 she assisted the grounded MV J.H. Hillman in the St. Clair River. During 23 through 25 August 1953 she ran a safety patrol for the Rochester Race in Lake Ontario. On 24 January 1955 she assisted an icebound tug and barges near Detroit. On 13 June 1955 Tupelo searched for a missing pleasure craft in western Lake Erie. On 20 April 1956 she assisted following collision between MV A.M. Byers and MV E.M. Ford off Sans Souci. On 14 July 1957 Tupelo patrolled the International Race near St Clair, Michigan. On 12 November 1957 she assisted a grounded vessel in Amherstburg Channel. On 1 March 1958 she helped restore power to Marblehead, Ohio. From 4 to 5 October 1958 Tupelo patrolled the Cleveland Race. During 25 through 26 Jul 1959 she patrolled Mackinac Island Race. In 1961 Tupelo salvaged PCJ-3776. On 1 August 1962 she assisted MV Montrose after it wrecked in the Detroit River.

On 12 January 1963 she assisted in the rescue of 154 persons stranded on an ice floe adrift 10 miles east of Toledo, on 25 January 1965 she escorted the damaged USCGC Bramble (WLB-392) to Toledo, Ohio for repair, in mid-September 1965 Tupelo salvaged a downed U.S. Navy helicopter from Lake Erie. On 31 January 1969 an ice jam blocked the flow of the river below Monroe, Michigan, causing the river to back up and flood the city, Tupelo broke up the ice jam, restoring the river's flow into the lake thus saving the city from extensive damage. During the Lake Erie station era Tupelo participated in Operation Coal Shovel.

In the spring of 1969 Tupelo was reassigned to Astoria, Oregon relieving USCGC Magnolia (WLB-328) Her duties there were maintaining Aids to Navigation (ATON), search and rescue operations, ice breaking and law and fishing treaty enforcement. Tupelo also tended the lightship USCGC Columbia (WLV-604) while Columbia was on station at the Columbia River Bar. From 9 through 11 October 1969 Tupelo stood by grounded British MV Hawthorne Enterprise on Mona Island until relieved by the USCGC Point Warde (WPB-82368).

On 30 September 1975 the Tupelo was decommissioned at a ceremony in Astoria, Oregon. In September 1977 Tupelo was sold to private enterprise. She underwent extensive rework to her superstructure and had a new power plant installed for her new Seattle owners, Baranof Fisheries. She was renamed FV Courageous and has been fishing the Bering Sea for crab and longlining for cod for the last thirty years. Her catches are also processed on board.

In October 2008 in rough seas, the FV Courageous was instrumental in assisting the U.S. Coast Guard on the FV Katmai search and rescue operation; and by recovering bodies from the sunken vessel.

== Awards and honors ==
US Coast Guard E Ribbon, for period of 19 to 23 August 1974 at Fleet Training Group (FTG) San Diego California.
