= Bay du Nord oil field =

Oil field in Canada

The Bay du Nord oil field is located 500 kilometres (310 mi) northeast of St. John's, Newfoundland. The offshore development is owned by Equinor (70 per cent interest) and Shell (30 per cent interest).

== History ==
The Bay du Nord discovery, located approximately 500 kilometres east of St. John's in water depths of about 1,200 metres, was discovered in 2013 and was estimated to contain nearly 300 million barrels of recoverable oil. The Bay du Nord (BDN) development project consists of six fields within close proximity. Two significant discovery licenses (Bay du Nord and Baccalieu) comprise the core BDN development area.

=== July 26, 2018: Announcement ===
In July 2018, the Government of Newfoundland and Labrador and Equinor Canada announced a framework agreement to develop the Bay du Nord oil project, marking the province's first planned deepwater offshore oil development and opening the Flemish Pass Basin as a new producing region beyond the established Jeanne d'Arc Basin. Premier Dwight Ball described the project as the beginning of a “new frontier” for the province's oil and gas industry and stated that it demonstrated Newfoundland and Labrador's emergence as a globally recognized location for deepwater oil production.

At the time of the announcement, the project was expected to be sanctioned in 2020, with first oil targeted for 2025 (this ultimately did not occur). Government and company officials emphasized that Bay du Nord would be the province's first remote deepwater development and would establish production in an entirely new offshore basin.

The proposed development was valued at approximately $6.8 billion, with Newfoundland and Labrador securing a 10 per cent equity stake through its provincial energy corporation. Government estimates projected approximately $3.5 billion in provincial revenues through royalties, taxes, and equity participation over the life of the project. Premier Ball argued that the province's investment would generate significant long-term returns and ensure that residents directly benefited from offshore resource development.

Economic benefits were a major focus of the announcement. The provincial government estimated that Bay du Nord would generate more than $14 billion in economic activity, support approximately 22.3 million person-hours of employment over its lifetime, and create roughly 500 operational jobs. Officials presented the project as a major source of long-term economic activity that would bring employment opportunities and investment to Newfoundland and Labrador for decades.

The agreement included substantial commitments to local participation. Approximately 90 per cent of project and procurement management activities were expected to occur within Newfoundland and Labrador, while 51 per cent of engineering work during pre-development and development phases would be completed locally. The project also included plans for approximately 5,000 metric tonnes of fabrication work within the province, along with investments intended to strengthen local subsea engineering and fabrication capabilities.

A key component of the benefits package was a commitment to invest at least $75 million over ten years in research and development, education, and workforce training. The goal was to position Newfoundland and Labrador as a deepwater centre of excellence, developing the technical expertise and skilled workforce required to support future offshore developments. Government officials viewed these investments as important to building long-term industrial capacity beyond the Bay du Nord project itself.

The project was also significant because it became the first offshore development negotiated under Newfoundland and Labrador's Generic Oil Royalty Regulations. Natural Resources Minister Siobhan Coady stated that Bay du Nord aligned with the province's Advance 2030 – The Way Forward on Oil and Gas strategy by opening a new basin, encouraging subsea development, attracting investment, and helping create a sustainable and globally competitive offshore industry.

Overall, the 2018 announcement positioned Bay du Nord as a transformational project for Newfoundland and Labrador. Beyond the expected billions in economic activity and government revenues, it was intended to establish the province's first deepwater oil field, expand offshore production into the Flemish Pass Basin, strengthen local engineering and fabrication industries, create thousands of years of employment, and lay the foundation for future offshore growth. Government and industry leaders characterized the project as the start of a new chapter in Newfoundland and Labrador's offshore petroleum industry.

=== December 2021: Environmental Assessment Report ===
The Bay du Nord Development Project Environmental Assessment Report (December 2021) was prepared by the Impact Assessment Agency of Canada to assess the environmental, social, cultural, and economic implications of Equinor Canada Ltd.'s proposal to develop a large offshore oil production project in the Flemish Pass Basin, approximately 500 kilometres east of St. John's, NL. The assessment was conducted under the Canadian Environmental Assessment Act, 2012 (CEAA 2012) and involved extensive review by federal agencies, Indigenous groups, industry stakeholders, environmental organizations, and the public.

The project proposes the development of the Bay du Nord and Baccalieu discoveries through a subsea production system connected to a Floating Production, Storage and Offloading vessel (FPSO). Over its life, the project could involve drilling up to 60 wells, including 40 wells in the core development area and up to 20 future tieback wells. Production is expected to continue for approximately 20 to 30 years, making it one of the largest and longest-lived offshore petroleum projects ever proposed in Newfoundland and Labrador. Oil would be transported from the FPSO by shuttle tankers either to Whiffen Head or directly to international markets.

The assessment focused on a series of "valued components" considered most susceptible to environmental change. These included fish and fish habitat, marine mammals, sea turtles, migratory birds, species at risk, special marine conservation areas, commercial fisheries, Indigenous use of resources, Indigenous rights, air quality, greenhouse gas emissions, cumulative environmental effects, and accidents or malfunctions such as major oil spills.

A major concern throughout the assessment was the effect of routine drilling operations on marine ecosystems. The project would generate large volumes of drilling mud and drill cuttings deposited onto the seabed. The Agency concluded these wastes could bury sensitive benthic habitats, including deep-water corals, sponges, and sea pen communities that provide habitat for numerous fish species. Installation of subsea wells, pipelines, anchors, mooring systems, and protective structures would physically disturb areas of seabed habitat. The Agency noted that recovery times for deep-water communities are uncertain and may require decades because many deep-sea corals and sponges grow very slowly. Despite these concerns, it concluded that impacts could be mitigated through extensive seabed surveys, relocation of infrastructure where necessary, environmental monitoring, and habitat protection measures.

Underwater noise emerged as another significant issue. The project would generate noise from drilling rigs, support vessels, FPSO operations, subsea construction, and future seismic surveys. Such noise has the potential to alter fish behaviour, displace marine mammals, interfere with communication and feeding, and affect migratory species. Marine mammals identified as potentially affected include fin whales, blue whales, northern bottlenose whales, harbour porpoises, sperm whales, and numerous dolphin species. The Agency acknowledged substantial uncertainty regarding marine mammal use of the project area because scientific data remain limited. Nevertheless, modelling suggested that behavioural effects rather than direct injury would be the most likely impact. Mandatory monitoring programs, vessel speed restrictions, marine mammal observers, and seismic shutdown procedures were recommended.

Particular attention was given to Atlantic salmon, one of the issues most frequently raised by Indigenous groups. Atlantic salmon populations across Atlantic Canada have undergone significant declines, and there is still considerable uncertainty regarding their ocean migration routes. Indigenous participants expressed concern that drilling discharges, underwater sound, and cumulative industrial activity could affect salmon survival and migration. Although Fisheries and Oceans Canada advised that interaction between salmon and the project area was likely low, the Agency acknowledged ongoing uncertainty and required the proponent to support Atlantic salmon research programs and annually report findings to Indigenous groups and regulators.

The assessment also devoted extensive attention to migratory birds, particularly the Leach's Storm-Petrel, a species experiencing significant declines and known to be highly attracted to offshore lighting. Artificial light from drilling platforms, vessels, and the FPSO could attract birds over long distances, increasing risks of collision, disorientation, exhaustion, and mortality. Flaring operations posed additional risks. Since little is known about the actual scale of bird mortality offshore, the Agency required extensive monitoring of stranded birds, reductions in unnecessary lighting, evaluation of bird-friendly lighting technologies, careful management of flaring, and participation in ongoing seabird research initiatives.

The report examined numerous special marine conservation areas that overlap or occur near the project area, including Ecologically and Biologically Significant Areas (EBSAs), NAFO fisheries closures, Vulnerable Marine Ecosystems (VMEs), and marine refuges. Many of these areas contain important coral and sponge communities and support commercially important fish stocks and marine mammals. Although project activities would occur partially within some of these sensitive areas, the Agency concluded that the relatively small physical footprint of infrastructure, combined with mitigation measures and monitoring, would limit impacts to a level that was not considered significant.

Commercial fisheries represented another major issue. Domestic, Indigenous, and foreign fisheries overlap portions of the project area, particularly in NAFO Divisions 3L and 3M. Operators, fishing organizations, and Indigenous groups worried about restricted access, gear conflicts, displacement from fishing grounds, and potential contamination concerns. The assessment found that exclusion zones around infrastructure would affect only a small portion of fishing grounds. However, the Agency required comprehensive communication plans, fisheries liaison programs, compensation mechanisms, and ongoing engagement with fishing interests throughout the life of the project.

Indigenous consultation was extensive and involved Inuit, Innu, Mi'kmaq, Mi'gmaq, Wolastoqey, and Peskotomuhkati communities across Atlantic Canada and Quebec. Many groups expressed concerns about Atlantic salmon, commercial fisheries, marine mammals, cumulative effects, accidents, and climate change. The Agency concluded that no Indigenous communities currently exercise rights directly within the project area itself, but acknowledged that migratory species affected offshore may later be harvested in Indigenous territories. It determined that mitigation measures directed at fish, marine mammals, birds, fisheries, and spill response would also serve as accommodations to reduce potential impacts on Aboriginal and treaty rights.

The report contains a lengthy examination of accidents and malfunctions, particularly blowouts and oil spills. Worst-case modelling considered uncontrolled subsea blowouts lasting up to 115 days. Results suggested that, under certain conditions, spilled oil could travel across vast areas of the North Atlantic and potentially reach European shorelines or parts of Newfoundland and Labrador. Large spills could affect fish populations, seabirds, marine mammals, sensitive habitats, fisheries, Indigenous harvesting, and species at risk. However, the Agency emphasized that modern well-control systems, capping stacks, spill response plans, containment procedures, and regulatory requirements make such events highly unlikely. Extensive contingency planning, wildlife response measures, compensation programs, and environmental monitoring were required.

Climate change and greenhouse gas emissions were also evaluated. Annual project emissions were estimated at 178,000 to 310,000 tonnes of carbon dioxide equivalent per year, representing a small fraction of Canada's overall emissions. Nonetheless, the Agency required the project to incorporate greenhouse gas reduction technologies and align with Canada's net-zero commitments and future regulatory requirements.

After evaluating all evidence, consultation feedback, and scientific analyses, the Agency concluded that the Bay du Nord Development Project is not likely to cause significant adverse environmental effects, including cumulative effects, provided that all proposed mitigation measures, monitoring programs, regulatory controls, and follow-up requirements are fully implemented. The final recommendation to the Minister was that the project could proceed subject to binding conditions associated with environmental protection, spill response, fisheries communication, Indigenous engagement, and long-term monitoring.

=== 2022-2026: Federal Approval and Three-Year Delay ===
On April 6, 2022, Equinor's project was approved under Section 54 of the Canadian Environmental Assessment Act, 2012 by the Federal government of Canada. Environment Minister Steven Guilbeault faced stiff opposition in cabinet but won the day.

On June 14, 2023, the project's development was shelved, for up to three years. That year, it was worth $16 billion.

On January 22, 2024, the project was restarted.

=== March 3, 2026: Announcement ===
On March 3, 2026, the Government of Newfoundland and Labrador announced that it had reached a major agreement with Equinor and BP to advance the Bay du Nord offshore oil development project. The agreement addressed three key areas: life-of-field benefits, royalties, and a provincial equity option. Provincial leaders described the deal as a defining moment for the province's offshore industry because Bay du Nord would become Newfoundland and Labrador's first new standalone offshore oil development since Hebron and Canada's first deepwater oil project. The government stated that the agreement ended the uncertainty that followed Equinor's 2023 decision to pause the project and created a path toward project sanction and development.

The agreement was presented as substantially stronger than the arrangement originally negotiated in 2018. Following discussions between the new provincial government, Equinor, and BP, the parties developed a package intended to maximize long-term value for Newfoundland and Labrador. Premier Tony Wakeham argued that the revised terms would ensure the province receives greater economic benefits throughout the life of the project while simultaneously restoring Newfoundland and Labrador's reputation as a preferred destination for global offshore investment. Equinor's Country President, Tore Løseth, stated that the agreement provides the confidence and certainty necessary to continue advancing Bay du Nord toward a final investment decision.

A central feature of the agreement was its projected financial return to the province. Government officials announced that Bay du Nord could generate up to $6.4 billion in direct provincial revenue during the first phase of development alone. The project will also become the first offshore development regulated under Newfoundland and Labrador's Generic Oil Royalty Regulations. Provincial officials argued that these revenues would support public services, economic development, and long-term fiscal sustainability while ensuring citizens receive a larger share of the wealth generated by the province's natural resources.

One of the most innovative aspects of the agreement is the introduction of Newfoundland and Labrador's first life-of-field benefits agreement. Previous offshore developments focused heavily on securing benefits during construction and installation phases. Under this arrangement, economic benefits are guaranteed across the project's entire lifespan. The provincial government estimated that the project would generate more than 31 million person-hours of work over approximately twenty-five years, creating a sustained employment base rather than temporary construction surges. Government officials emphasized that this approach was designed specifically to prevent the boom-and-bust cycles often associated with major resource developments.

The agreement also grants the province an option to acquire up to a 10 per cent ownership interest in the Bay du Nord project. Provincial officials described this equity option as particularly important because it gives Newfoundland and Labrador a direct role in future project growth and profitability. Rather than relying solely on royalties and taxes, the province could potentially earn additional revenues as a project partner. Premier Wakeham indicated that the government was seriously exploring the option and suggested that ownership could generate hundreds of millions of dollars in additional future returns.

A major objective of the agreement was ensuring that project construction and fabrication occur within Newfoundland and Labrador. The agreement commits Equinor and its partners to completing a minimum of 95 per cent of all subsea fabrication work in the province. Expressions of interest had already been issued for major construction opportunities, including topsides work. Provincial leaders argued that these commitments would ensure local companies, workers, and suppliers receive the largest possible share of project activity while strengthening Newfoundland and Labrador's industrial and fabrication sectors.

The employment commitments were substantial and covered both construction and operations. Provincial background documents projected at least three million hours of fabrication employment, 1.9 million hours of professional services work in engineering, project management, and procurement, 3.4 million hours associated with drilling and completions, and approximately 23 million direct operational hours. When indirect employment was included, operations were expected to generate approximately 55 million total employment hours. These projections reflect a workforce spanning skilled trades, technical professions, engineering disciplines, and offshore operations.

The agreement also established apprentice employment requirements that have not previously existed on Newfoundland and Labrador offshore projects. Apprentices are required to account for 10 per cent of construction employment hours and 15 per cent of onshore operational employment hours. The provincial government highlighted these targets as a major workforce-development initiative intended to train future generations of skilled tradespeople while ensuring knowledge transfer and labour force renewal. CBC reported that the apprentice commitments aligned with promises made by Premier Wakeham during the provincial election campaign.

One of the most significant industrial announcements was the creation of a $200 million fabrication fund intended to support development of a large floating dry dock at Bull Arm. The proposed facility would weigh between 7,000 and 8,000 tonnes and serve as a centre for fabrication, repair, maintenance, and marine industrial activity. Simultaneously, the provincial government announced that it would maintain ownership of the Bull Arm site and cancel a previous memorandum of understanding that would have transferred operational control to North Atlantic. Officials described the floating dry dock as a transformative long-term asset that could establish an entirely new maintenance and repair industry in Newfoundland and Labrador.

Beyond fabrication and construction, the agreement included major commitments related to innovation and economic diversification. The project partners committed $100 million for research and development, focusing on emerging fields such as artificial intelligence, additive manufacturing, marine technologies, robotics, and autonomous systems. Provincial officials argued that this investment would strengthen Newfoundland and Labrador's position as a global centre for offshore innovation and advanced industrial technology while supporting long-term economic diversification.

The agreement further provides for the establishment of an Integrated Operations Centre located in Newfoundland and Labrador, with approximately 100 positions dedicated to local management of offshore operations. Procurement commitments were also strengthened through Atlantic Accord provisions requiring first consideration for provincial firms when competitive in competence, quality, price, and delivery. Additionally, a comprehensive Gender Equity, Diversity and Inclusion Plan will be developed to encourage participation by traditionally underrepresented groups.

The federal government strongly endorsed the agreement. Natural Resources Canada described Newfoundland and Labrador's offshore industry as a key component of Canada's energy strategy, noting that it supports nearly 20,000 jobs, contributes almost 20 per cent of provincial GDP, and accounts for approximately 55 per cent of provincial exports. Ottawa argued that Bay du Nord has the potential to create thousands of jobs, attract billions in investment, and strengthen Canada's position as a secure and reliable energy supplier in international markets. Federal officials also emphasized that oil produced offshore Newfoundland and Labrador has lower extraction emissions than the global average.

Bay du Nord itself is one of the largest discoveries ever made offshore Newfoundland and Labrador. The field was discovered in 2013 and, at the time of the March announcement, contained an estimated 430 million barrels of recoverable oil. It is situated approximately 500 kilometres east of St. John's in the Flemish Pass Basin and would operate in water depths of roughly 1,200 metres, making it Canada's first deepwater offshore oil development. The government projected approximately $3.2 billion in capital expenditures and $15 billion in operating expenditures over the life of the project. A final investment decision remained targeted for 2027, with first oil anticipated in 2031.

Overall, the March 3, 2026, agreement represented far more than a traditional benefits package. It combined royalties, a provincial ownership option, local fabrication guarantees, workforce development targets, research investments, procurement commitments, and industrial infrastructure development into a comprehensive framework designed to maximize provincial participation. Provincial, federal, and industry leaders collectively portrayed the agreement as the key milestone needed to move Bay du Nord from a paused project toward what they hoped would become Canada's first deepwater oil production development.

=== July 6, 2026: BP Exits ===
On July 6, 2026, BP announced that it had agreed to sell its interest in Bay du Nord to Equinor. At the time of the sale, BP held interests across 10 licences associated with Bay du Nord, with an average working interest of 37.2 percent. Equinor stated that the acquisition reflected its confidence in the project's future and noted that significant work had been completed in recent years to strengthen the business case and reduce development risks. The company announced plans to seek additional partners as the project advances and reaffirmed its target of a final investment decision by early 2027, subject to market conditions, regulatory approvals, and internal review processes.

=== October 9, 2026: Shell Enters ===
On October 9, 2026, Equinor announced that it had reached an agreement for Shell to buy a 30 percent stake in the proposed oil project. Equinor reiterated that it expects to decide whether to proceed with the $14-billion Bay du Nord development in early 2027.

=== November 20, 2026: Development Application Approval ===
On November 20, 2026, the Canada-Newfoundland and Labrador Offshore Energy Regulator (C-NLOER) announced that the Bay du Nord Development Application had been approved. Under the Atlantic Accord Implementation Acts, approval of the Benefits Plan and Development Plan is a C-NLOER Board decision. Following the close of the public review, Equinor submitted an updated Benefits Plan to the C-NLOER, largely to better reflect the provincial Benefits Agreement. The Board subsequently approved the Development Plan and the updated Benefits Plan. Approval of the Development Plan, excluding the Benefits Plan, is also a Fundamental Decision requiring approval by the federal Minister of Energy and Natural Resources and the provincial Minister of Energy and Mines. Both Ministers approved the Development Plan. Early in the month, Premier Tony Wakeham had indicated that the provincial government is strongly considering taking a 10 per cent stake in the Bay du Nord project.

== Criticisms of the Bay du Nord Project ==
The Bay du Nord project has been criticized by environmental groups, most notably the Sierra Club Canada Foundation and the WWF-Canada. Following the announcement on March 3, 2026 of the benefits agreement between the Government of Newfoundland and Labrador and Equinor, the Sierra Club issued a statement calling for no provincial investment in the project.

While providing written feedback on the project in September 2020, the Sierra Club Canada Foundation portrayed Bay du Nord as a project whose risks had been systematically underestimated and whose environmental assessment failed to adequately account for the realities of deepwater offshore oil production. The organization began by emphasizing that Bay du Nord would be Canada's first deepwater production development, operating in water depths approaching 1,200 metres in the Flemish Pass Basin. According to Sierra Club, regulators and Equinor relied too heavily on comparisons with existing projects in the Jeanne d'Arc Basin, despite the fact that Bay du Nord would be operating in a fundamentally different environment. Deepwater drilling introduces higher pressures, greater technical complexity, longer distances from emergency equipment, and increased difficulties responding to accidents. Sierra Club argued that these differences warranted far more caution than the assessment displayed.

The organization's criticism of greenhouse gas emissions was particularly pointed. Sierra Club argued that Equinor had effectively removed atmospheric emissions from the centre of the assessment by declining to treat greenhouse gases as a valued environmental component. This decision was described as unacceptable in the context of worsening climate change. The organization maintained that a proper cumulative-effects assessment should have evaluated Bay du Nord's emissions in combination with other fossil fuel developments rather than considering them in isolation. Sierra Club also argued that the project focused largely on combustion-related emissions while ignoring methane leaks, fugitive emissions, venting, and accidental releases. The absence of meaningful discussion of methane was described as especially problematic given growing evidence that methane emissions are significantly underreported throughout the oil and gas sector.

The document also criticized the lack of transparency regarding the future destination of Bay du Nord oil. Sierra Club argued that the environmental assessment never clearly explained who the expected customers would be or what markets the project was designed to serve. Because transport routes, shipping distances, and tanker operations affect both emissions and environmental risk, the absence of a serious market analysis was viewed as a significant weakness. The organization's position was that understanding the purpose of the project requires understanding where the oil would ultimately be consumed.

The most extensive criticism focused on oil spill preparedness. Sierra Club's analysis argued that the response plans relied heavily on technologies that had repeatedly failed in previous offshore disasters. Drawing comparisons to Deepwater Horizon, Exxon Valdez, and more recent Atlantic Canadian incidents, the organization contended that floating booms, skimmers, in-situ burning, dispersants, and vessel-based recovery systems are largely ineffective in the harsh North Atlantic environment. Rough seas, high winds, strong currents, ice, fog, freezing spray, and remote operating conditions were all cited as reasons why conventional oil-spill response tools would be unable to recover meaningful quantities of spilled oil. According to Sierra Club, a major spill in the Bay du Nord environment could not realistically be cleaned up using currently available technology.

The organization was particularly critical of dispersants. It argued that rather than eliminating pollution, dispersants simply transfer oil from the ocean surface into the water column and food chain. This process could spread contamination into ecologically important regions such as the Flemish Cap, Scotian Shelf, and Gulf of Maine. Sierra Club suggested that the supposed benefits of dispersants came largely from making oil less visible rather than reducing environmental harm.

Ultimately, Sierra Club portrayed Bay du Nord as a project predicated on overconfidence in prevention measures, unrealistic assumptions about emergency response capability, and the systematic minimization of low probability but potentially catastrophic events. The organization argued that the possibility of a major blowout, tanker accident, structural failure, or prolonged uncontrolled release had not been adequately addressed.

While providing written feedback on the project in September 2021, WWF-Canada presented Bay du Nord primarily as a project that could not be reconciled with the realities of the climate crisis. The central criticism was that regulators had concluded the project was unlikely to cause significant environmental effects despite overwhelming scientific evidence that continued fossil fuel expansion contributes directly to global warming. WWF argued that Bay du Nord would produce millions of barrels of oil over decades and that the resulting emissions would add substantially to atmospheric carbon dioxide levels at a time when scientists were calling for rapid reductions in fossil fuel use. WWF rejected the argument that Bay du Nord's emissions were small when compared with Canada's total emissions, noting that every oil project is relatively small in isolation but collectively these projects are responsible for the climate crisis. The organization pointed to the findings of the Intergovernmental Panel on Climate Change and the International Energy Agency, which had concluded that avoiding the worst climate outcomes would require an end to new fossil fuel development. WWF argued that regulators had failed to grapple seriously with these realities.

Beyond climate concerns, WWF challenged the way the environmental assessment was conducted. The organization argued that environmental assessments frequently underestimate impacts because they rely too heavily on mitigation measures that have not been proven effective. WWF described the concept of "significance" in environmental assessments as highly subjective and criticized the lack of transparency in how Bay du Nord's risks were ultimately deemed insignificant. According to WWF, numerous potentially serious effects were acknowledged in the assessment but then downplayed through assumptions about mitigation and monitoring.

Particular concern was expressed about underwater noise from seismic surveys and industrial vessel traffic. WWF maintained that available science showed marine noise can travel immense distances and affect whales, dolphins, porpoises, fish, squid, plankton, and other organisms. The assessment's conclusion that impacts would be relatively minor was viewed as unjustified. WWF argued that current mitigation measures, such as marine mammal observers, exclusion zones, and gradual "ramp-up" procedures, were largely unproven and often ineffective. The organization emphasized that many marine animals are difficult to detect, spend long periods underwater, and may be present in poor weather conditions where observation is highly unreliable. The result, WWF argued, was a substantial underestimation of ecological risk.

WWF was similarly critical of the project's potential impacts on deep-sea ecosystems. The organization highlighted concerns about coral and sponge habitats, fisheries closure areas, and other ecologically important benthic environments located near project activities. It noted that federal scientific advice had emphasized avoidance of sensitive habitats because damage to deep-water ecosystems can persist for decades and may not be reversible. WWF argued that drilling muds, cuttings, waste discharges, and seabed disturbance could affect larger areas than predicted by Equinor and that claims of negligible impacts were not well supported. In WWF's view, the project should be prohibited from operating in protected areas and sensitive habitat zones altogether.

Emergency preparedness represented another major concern. WWF argued that plans for responding to a blowout were inadequate because critical containment equipment would have to be brought from Norway or Brazil. In the event of a major well-control incident, oil could potentially flow for weeks before a capping stack arrived and for months before a relief well was completed. Given Newfoundland and Labrador's severe weather conditions, deep water, and remote location, WWF questioned whether regulators had properly considered the consequences of a worst-case event. The organization also criticized assumptions that financial compensation alone could address long-term damage to fisheries, Indigenous cultural practices, and coastal communities.

Memorial University Assistant Professor Dr. Lori Lee Oates provided written feedback in August 2026. Dr. Oates approached Bay du Nord as not simply an economic project but as part of a larger system that has repeatedly exposed workers and families to risk. Oates argues that collective memories of offshore disasters remain deeply embedded in Newfoundland and Labrador society and that persistent concerns remain about evacuation, emergency preparedness, and worker safety.

Oates's core economic criticism of the project is grounded in resource-curse theory. Oates argues that Newfoundland and Labrador has spent decades relying on resource extraction as a path to prosperity yet continues to struggle with debt, economic instability, and unequal development. Despite the development of Hibernia, Terra Nova, White Rose, Hebron, and associated projects, the province remains burdened by major fiscal challenges. According to Oates, oil revenues have not fundamentally transformed the province's economy and may have reinforced dependence on volatile global commodity markets. Bay du Nord is therefore presented as a continuation of a development model that has consistently fallen short of its promises.

Another major criticism concerns the unequal distribution of benefits. Oates argues that oil wealth tends to concentrate in St. John's, where government departments, service firms, universities, contractors, and related industries are located. Rural Newfoundland, as well as Labrador, often experience the environmental and social consequences of resource development while receiving a disproportionately small share of benefits. Bay du Nord is described as perpetuating this longstanding pattern of regional inequality and economic centralization.

Climate change occupies a significant portion of her criticisms. Oates argues that scientific evidence clearly demonstrates the need to stop developing new fossil fuel projects if the world hopes to remain within internationally agreed climate targets. She rejects claims that Newfoundland and Labrador oil can simultaneously support climate action and continued fossil fuel expansion. The submission emphasizes that every offshore oil project contributes to cumulative emissions and that climate impacts fall disproportionately on vulnerable populations, Indigenous communities, and residents of northern regions. Bay du Nord is therefore framed not only as an environmental issue but also as an issue of climate justice.

Perhaps the most distinctive aspect of Oates' critique concerns gender and social inequality. She argues that the project's socio-economic impact assessment claims to apply Gender-Based Analysis Plus (GBA+) but fails to conduct a truly intersectional analysis. In her view, the report largely ignores Indigenous women, racialized women, disabled women, LGBTQ2 communities, immigrants, rural women, and other marginalized groups. She contends that consultations focused primarily on St. John's and failed to meaningfully engage many populations likely to experience exclusion from project benefits.

Oates also situates Bay du Nord within broader patterns of gender inequality in resource economies. She argues that the highest-paying jobs in oil, construction, and offshore industries continue to go predominantly to men, while women remain concentrated in lower-paid sectors such as health care, education, administration, and retail services. The result, she argues, is that resource development reinforces gender wage gaps and traditional divisions of labour. The offshore rotational work system is also criticized for placing significant pressures on families, particularly women who often assume greater caregiving responsibilities when partners are working offshore. Bay du Nord is portrayed as likely to continue these dynamics while doing little to address underlying inequalities.

Overall, Oates presents Bay du Nord as the latest manifestation of a broader extractive development model that she believes has contributed to climate change, economic dependency, regional inequality, persistent gender inequities, and recurring workplace risks throughout Newfoundland and Labrador's modern history.
