= Cougar Helicopters =

Canadian helicopter operator

Cougar Helicopters Incorporated

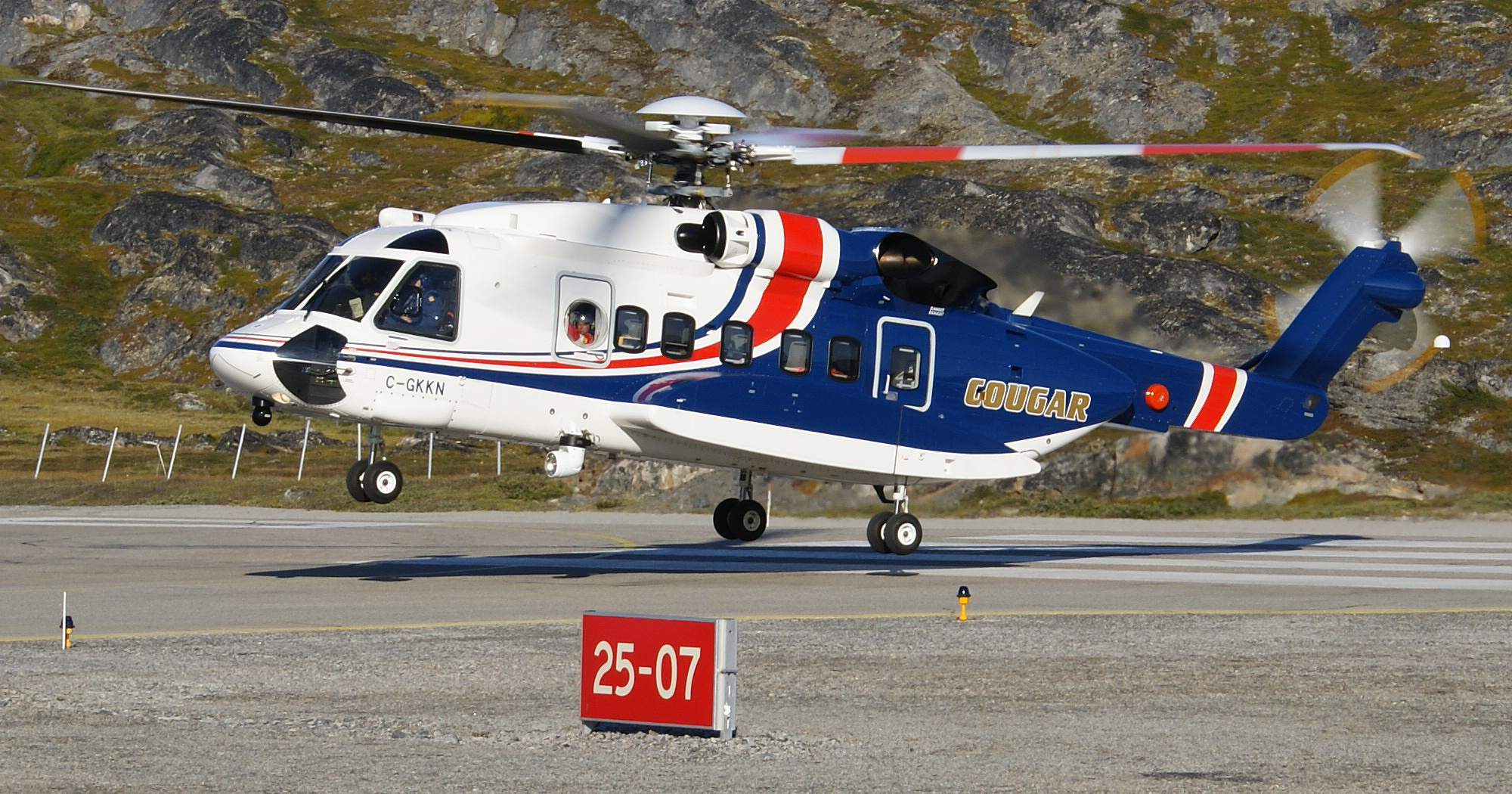
- Sikorsky S-92 landing at Ilulissat Airport, Greenland
IATA	ICAO	Call sign
-	CHI	COUGAR
- Founded: Halifax, Nova Scotia
- Commenced operations: 1984; 41 years ago
- AOC #: 4791
- Hubs: St. John's, Newfoundland
- Fleet size: 9
- Destinations: Hibernia GBS; White Rose oil field Terra Nova oil field
- Parent company: VIH Aviation Group
- Headquarters: St. John's, Newfoundland and Labrador, Canada
- Key people: Ken Norie, President and CEO; Hank Williams, General Manager
- Website: www.cougar.ca/

Cougar Helicopters (a VIH Aviation Group Company) is a St. John's based commercial helicopter company servicing offshore oil and gas fields off the coast of Newfoundland. Cougar has permanent facilities in St. John's and Halifax. The company is affiliated with Bristow Helicopters which has a financial stake in Cougar.

== Services ==
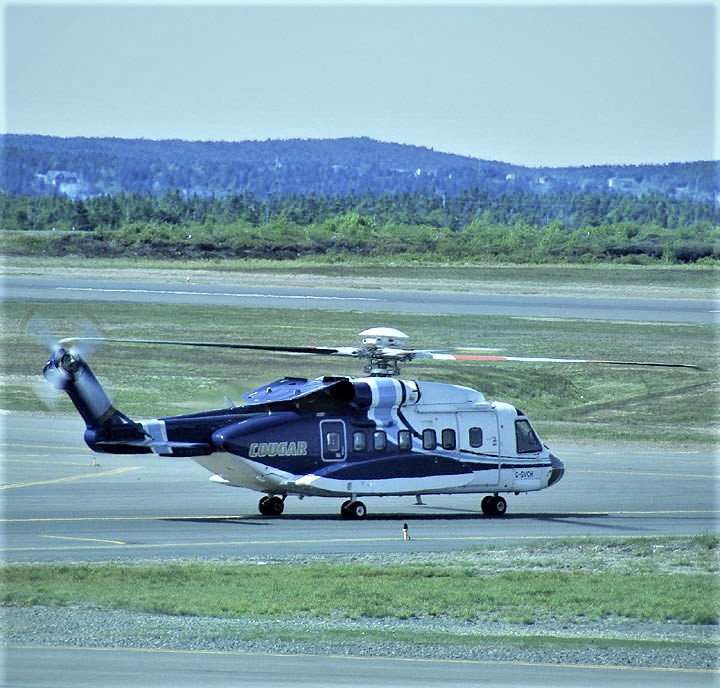
Cougar Helicopter, St. Johns, NL

Cougar Helicopters currently services platforms and ships located off Newfoundland in the:

- Hibernia oil field
- Terra Nova oil field
- White Rose oil field
- Hebron-Ben Nevis oil field

== Fleet ==
As of May 2024, Cougar Helicopters operates a fleet of eight Sikorsky S-92A and one Bell 412EP.

== Incidents and accidents ==
On 12 March 2009, Cougar Helicopters Flight 91, a Cougar Sikorsky S-92A helicopter carrying 18 passengers and crew en route to an oil platform off the coast of Newfoundland, ditched and sank in 178 metres of water. 17 of the 18 people on board died in the crash.
