= Geography of Newfoundland and Labrador =

Newfoundland and Labrador

Map of Canada (geopolitical)

Country
Canada
Geographic coordinates
51°00′N 57°00′W
Area
- Total
- Water
Ranked 7th
405,720 km^{2}
31,240 km^{2} (7.7%)
Coastline
17,542 km (10,900 mi)
Land borders
Quebec
Nunavut (Killiniq Island)
Maritime Borders
Nunavut
Nova Scotia
Prince Edward Island
Saint Pierre and Miquelon
Highest point
Mount Caubvick, 1,652 m (5,420 ft)
Lowest point
Atlantic Ocean, 0 m
Longest river
Churchill River 856 km (532 mi)
Largest inland body of water
Smallwood Reservoir 31,153 km^{2} (12,028 sq mi)
Climate:
Temperate to arctic
Terrain:
mountains, subarctic, arctic
Natural resources
iron ore, nickel, zinc, copper, gold, silver, fish, timber, petroleum, hydropower

Newfoundland and Labrador is the easternmost province in Canada. The Strait of Belle Isle separates the province into two geographical regions, Labrador and the island of Newfoundland. The province also includes over seven thousand small islands.

Labrador is the easternmost part of the Canadian Shield, a vast area of ancient metamorphic rock comprising much of northeastern North America. Colliding tectonic plates have shaped much of the geology of Newfoundland. Gros Morne National Park has a reputation of being an outstanding example of tectonics at work, and as such has been designated a World Heritage Site. The Long Range Mountains on Newfoundland's west coast are the northeasternmost extension of the Appalachian Mountains.

The fauna of Labrador is typical of that of similar areas of North America while the island of Newfoundland has considerably fewer mammals and no native amphibians.

The north–south extent of the province (46°36'N to 60°22'N), prevalent westerly winds, cold ocean currents and local factors such as mountains and coastline combine to create the various climates of the province. Northern Labrador is classified as a polar tundra climate, southern Labrador is considered to be a subarctic climate while most of Newfoundland would be considered to be a cool summer subtype of a humid continental climate.

The provincial capital is St. John's, located at the extreme eastern edge of the island, Newfoundland, on the Avalon Peninsula. About half of the province's economy is based on its abundant natural resources, notably petroleum, minerals, forestry and the fishery.

== Physical geography ==
Newfoundland is roughly triangular, with each side being approximately 500 kilometres (310 mi), and having an area of 108,860 square kilometres (42,030 sq mi). Newfoundland and its associated small islands have a total area of 111,390 square kilometres (43,010 sq mi). Newfoundland extends between latitudes 46°36'N and 51°38'N. It lies at similar latitudes to Great Britain, and the Kamchatka Peninsula in Russia.

Labrador is an irregular shape: the western part of its border with Quebec is the drainage divide for the Labrador Peninsula. Lands drained by rivers that flow into the Atlantic Ocean are part of Labrador, the rest belongs to Quebec. Labrador's extreme northern tip, at 60°22'N, shares a short border with Nunavut on Killiniq Island. Labrador's area (including associated small islands) is 294,330 square kilometres (113,640 sq mi). Together, Newfoundland and Labrador make up 4.06% of Canada's area.

The island of Newfoundland is separated from Labrador by the Strait of Belle Isle, which is 125 kilometres (78 mi) long and from 60 to 15 kilometres (37.3 to 9.3 mi) wide. In addition to the island of Newfoundland, the province is made up of 12 larger islands with a total area of 2,505 square kilometres (967 sq mi) and 7,170 smaller islands with a total area of 3,598 square kilometres (1,389 sq mi).

== Biosphere ==
The biosphere is subdivided into geographical regions called biomes. Newfoundland and Labrador are divided into two biomes: tundra and taiga. Northern Labrador is part of the tundra, while southern Labrador is part of the taiga. Newfoundland is not typical of either biome, as it lacks much of the plant and animal life that are characteristic to these biomes. During the last ice age the island of Newfoundland was completely covered by glaciers and swept clean of life. Only those species which were able to recolonize the island after the glaciers retreated about 18,000 years ago are considered "native". Similarly, only freshwater-fish capable of surviving seawater swam to the island. Labrador has 42 native mammals, Newfoundland is home only to 14, with no snakes, raccoons, skunks or porcupines. Large herds of woodland caribou can be found in the barren interior regions of the island. Two animals formerly resident in Newfoundland have been declared extinct: the great auk, a flightless seabird, and the Newfoundland wolf, a subspecies of the gray wolf. The Labrador duck, believed to have nested in Labrador, was one of the first North American bird species to be recorded as becoming extinct.

Many herbaceous plants and insects occur on the island. The west coast of the island supports over 200 plant species. Rare species such as Long's braya (Braya longii) and Fernald's braya (B. fernaldii), are endemic to Newfoundland. Brayas are small perennial herbs of the family Brassicaceae. They are only found on a narrow strip of land extending approximately 150 kilometres (93 mi) on the extreme western portion of the Great Northern Peninsula, a limestones barrens habitat. The braya population is low due to habitat loss from gravel quarrying. Researchers have only found three populations of Long's braya, and 14 or 15 populations of Fernald's brayas. Researchers have focused on how various types of disturbances affect the long-term viability of these populations. The Province of Newfoundland and Labrador, with many partners, is studying the rare plant flora of the island of Newfoundland and in 2002 announced a recovery plan for the braya species.

Many plants and animals have been introduced to Newfoundland, either by chance or deliberately. Moose, snowshoe hare, American red squirrel, eastern chipmunk, and masked shrew, and others, were brought to the island through specific wildlife mandates. Moose were introduced in 1904 and are now the dominant ungulate on the island. An unusual experiment conducted in 1964 involved relocating a small herd of bison onto Brunette Island in Fortune Bay. The last of these animals is thought to have died by 1994. Rats and mice were unintentionally introduced while mink escaped from fur farms. Coyotes are a very recent addition to the fauna of Newfoundland. How coyotes got onto the island is still debated by wildlife officials, but it is probable that they crossed the ice from Cape Breton Island in the 1980s. Newfoundland has no native amphibians, but frogs were introduced onto the island in the 1860s and toads almost a century later.

The marine waters around the province are considered boreal, or sub-Arctic, in nature. A great deal of the coastline is rock-strewn, allowing an extensive variety of plant and animal life to thrive. The leading plants of the shoreline are the large brown seaweeds, such as bladder, forked and knotted wracks, and winged and sugar kelps, though there are also a number of red and green seaweeds present. Common animals of the seashore region include barnacles, tortoiseshell limpet, common periwinkle, blue mussels, sea anemones, sea slugs, sea urchins, starfish, and rock crabs. The deeper waters are home to a variety of fish, such as Atlantic cod, sculpins and cunners, halibut, haddock, sharks, and marine mammals, such as dolphins, porpoises, and whales. Whales seen off Newfoundland include pilot whales, minkes, sei whales, fin whales and humpbacks. Harp and hooded seals are usually found in the spring, giving birth on coastal ice floes.

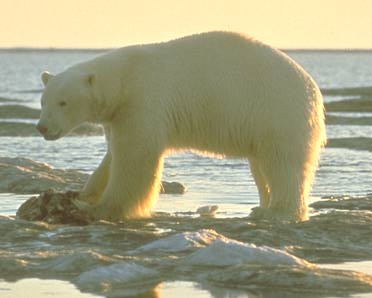
The polar bear (Ursus maritimus) is the dominant carnivore in the tundra.

The tundra is a sub-Arctic zone with long, cold winters and short, warm summers. Precipitation is low. Soil a meter below ground and deeper is permanently frozen (permafrost), which does not allow water to drain easily through the soil, so it collects in shallow pools. Trees and shrubs are stunted since their roots cannot grow into the permafrost. Low shrubs, lichens, mosses, and small herbaceous plants are found instead. The most common mammals on the tundra are the barren-ground caribou, Labrador wolf, Arctic fox, Arctic hare, lemmings, and voles. Occasional sightings of muskoxen have been made near Cape Chidley, Labrador's most northerly point. The polar bear is the dominant carnivore of the tundra, but is an occasional visitor to coastal Newfoundland, especially in the spring. Many birds migrate to Labrador in spring to lay their eggs and raise their young before returning south for the winter, including the common eider, harlequin duck, common redpoll and American pipit. The Labrador tundra is also permanent home to ptarmigan.

Southern Labrador is mostly taiga. It is characterized by low winter temperatures, a longer growing season, and more precipitation than the tundra. Soils are typically lacking important nutrients such as nitrogen and phosphorus. The taiga is dominated by coniferous trees, notably balsam fir and black spruce, though the deciduous white birch, trembling aspen and mountain ash are also present. The most common animals are the moose, American black bear, Canada lynx, red fox, American marten, short-tailed weasel, and American mink. Beavers, muskrats, and river otters thrive in the many rivers, streams, and wetlands. Willow ptarmigan, common raven, and blackpoll warbler inhabit the forests of southern Labrador while golden eagles, rough-legged hawks and peregrine falcons nest on steep cliffs.

== Climate ==
The province has been divided into seven climate types, but in broader terms Newfoundland is considered to be a cool summer subtype of a humid continental climate, which is greatly influenced by the sea since no part of the island is more than 100 kilometres (62 mi) from the ocean. Northern Labrador is classified as a polar tundra climate, southern Labrador is considered to have a subarctic climate.

Monthly average temperatures, rainfall and snowfall for four communities are shown in the attached graphs. St. John's represents the east coast, Gander the interior of the island, Corner Brook the west coast of the island and Wabush the interior of Labrador. The detailed information and information for 73 communities in the province is available from a government website. The data used in making the graphs is the average taken over thirty years. Error bars on the temperature graph indicate the range of daytime highs and night time lows. Snowfall is the total amount which fell during the month, not the amount accumulated on the ground. This distinction is particularly important for St. John's where a heavy snowfall can be followed by rain so that no snow remains on the ground.

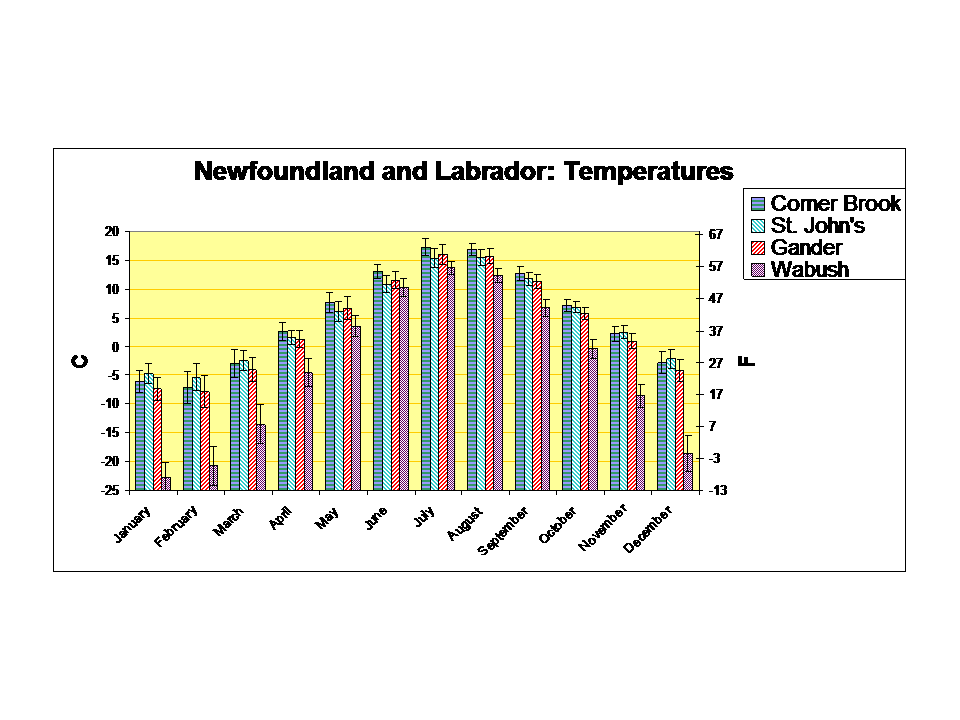
Newfoundland and Labrador average monthly temperatures

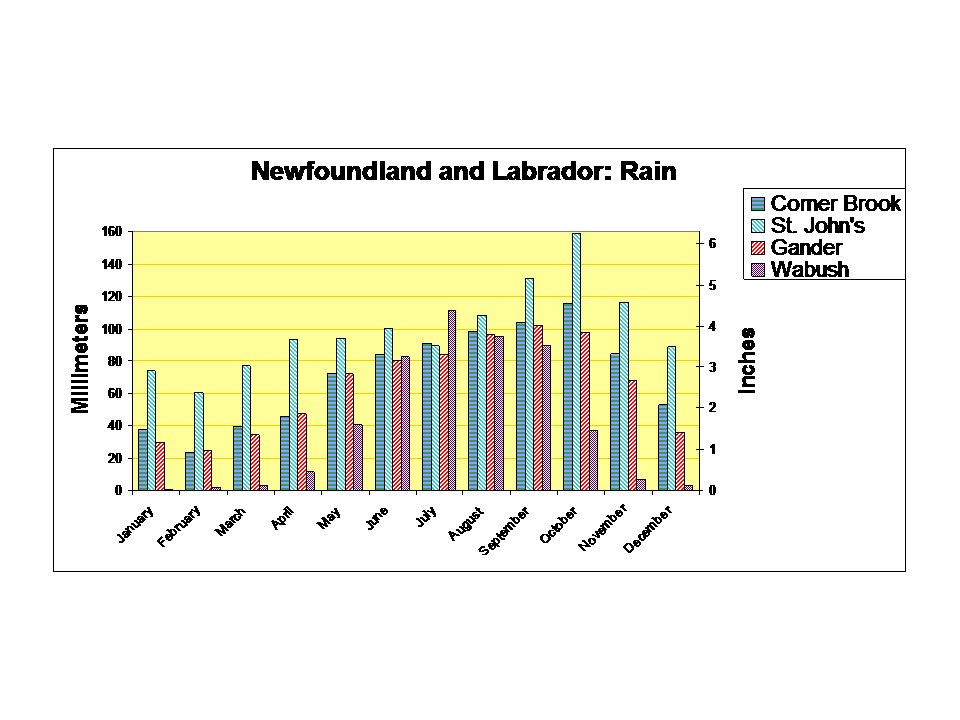
Newfoundland and Labrador average monthly rainfall

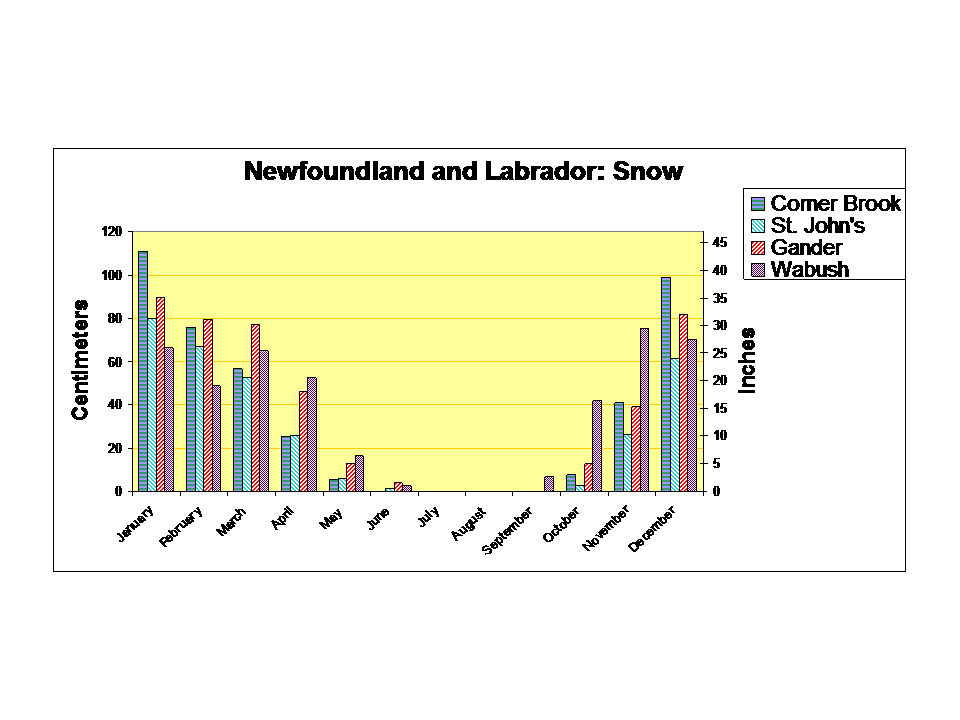
Newfoundland and Labrador average monthly snowfall

Surface water temperatures on the Atlantic side reaches a summer average of 12 °C (54 °F) inshore and 9 °C (48 °F) offshore to winter lows of −1 °C (30 °F) inshore and 2 °C (36 °F) offshore. Sea temperatures on the west coast are warmer than Atlantic side by 1 to 3 °C (approximately 2 to 5 °F). The sea keeps winter temperatures slightly higher and summer temperatures a little lower on the coast than at places inland. The maritime climate produces more variable weather, ample precipitation in a variety of forms, greater humidity, lower visibility, more clouds, less sunshine, and higher winds than a continental climate. Some of these effects can be seen in the graphs. Labrador's climate differs from that of the island not only because it is further north, but also because the interior does not see the moderating effects of the ocean.

Weather systems affecting Newfoundland usually originate from the west, over mainland Canada, or from the southwest, from the east coast of the United States. Cyclonic storms consist of an area of low atmospheric pressure characterized by inward spiraling winds that rotate counter clockwise in the Northern Hemisphere. Such storms passing to the south of the island bring strong northeasterly winds sweeping in off the open North Atlantic Ocean. These storms are sometimes referred to as nor'easters and are responsible for the worst of Newfoundland's weather. High winds sweeping over a large surface of ocean can build up very large waves. The frequency and severity of storms is greatest between November and March, although they may occur at any time of the year.

One of these storms was the "Independence Hurricane", which struck eastern Newfoundland on September 9, 1775. About 4000 sailors, mostly from the British Isles, were reported to have been drowned.

During a violent storm on February 15, 1982, the drilling rig Ocean Ranger capsized and sank on the Grand Banks, 300 kilometres (190 mi) east of St. John's. The entire 84-man crew perished, making it the worst Canadian marine disaster in decades.

Newfoundland and Labrador has the strongest winds of any of the provinces, with most places having average annual wind speeds over 20 kilometres per hour (12 mph).

Freezing rain is common in Newfoundland where it is known as "silver thaw". Freezing drizzle or freezing rain occurs on average of 150 hours each winter, most commonly in March. One such storm struck St. John's on April 11, 1984, and lasted three days. Ice almost 15 centimetres (5.9 in) thick disrupted electrical power to 200,000 people on the Avalon Peninsula for days.

Newfoundland receives less than 1600 hours of sunshine per year, much lower than the Canadian average of 1925 hours. Summer months average 187 hours of sun while the December average is 60 hours.

Newfoundland is also known for its fog which occurs most often in the spring and early summer because of the contrast between sea and air temperatures. Argentia has 206 days of fog per year. Fog in Newfoundland is frequently accompanied by strong onshore winds; while usually winds disperse fog, here the fog is too widespread for this to occur.

Average daily maximum/minimum temperatures
Location	July		January	
Location	°C	°F	°C	°F
St. John's	20/11	68/52	−1/−9	30/16
Gander	21/11	71/51	−3/−12	26/11
Corner Brook	22/13	71/55	−3/−10	28/15
Stephenville	20/13	68/55	−2/−9	28/15
Happy Valley-Goose Bay	20/10	68/49	−13/−23	9/−9
Nain	15/5	59/41	−14/−23	7/−10

=== St. John's weather extremes ===
Of all the major Canadian cities, St. John's is the foggiest (124 days, next to Halifax's 122), snowiest (359 centimetres (141 in), next to Quebec City's 343 centimetres (135 in)), wettest (1514 millimetres (59.6 in), next to Halifax's 1491 millimetres (58.7 in)), windiest (24.3 km/h (15.1 mph) average speed, next to Regina's 20.7 km/h (12.9 mph)), and cloudiest (1,497 hours of sunshine, next to Charlottetown's 1,818 hours). St. John's has one of the mildest winters in Canada (third mildest city next to Victoria and Vancouver), yet has the most freezing rain days of any major Canadian city.

== Hydrography ==
=== Fresh water ===
Shallow soil and bedrock deeply scored by glaciers are responsible for the numerous lakes and ponds, and short, swift flowing rivers scattered across Newfoundland and Labrador. The area of freshwater in Newfoundland and Labrador is 31,340 square kilometres (12,100 sq mi), covering 7.7% of the total surface of area of the province and accounting for 3.5% of the freshwater area of Canada.

=== Ocean ===
The west coast of Newfoundland borders on the Gulf of St. Lawrence while all other coasts face the Atlantic Ocean. Labrador's coast borders the Labrador Sea, a part of the Atlantic Ocean. The Strait of Belle Isle connects the Gulf of St. Lawrence with the Labrador Sea and is the narrowest channel separating Newfoundland from mainland Canada. The Cabot Strait separates Newfoundland from Cape Breton Island, Nova Scotia.

The continental shelf off Newfoundland is known as the Grand Banks. The cold Labrador Current and the warm Gulf Stream meet on the Grand Banks, making the area not only one of the richest fishing grounds in the world, but also one of the foggiest areas. The Grand Banks are an area of significant petroleum production with Hibernia, White Rose and Terra Nova oil fields all located there.

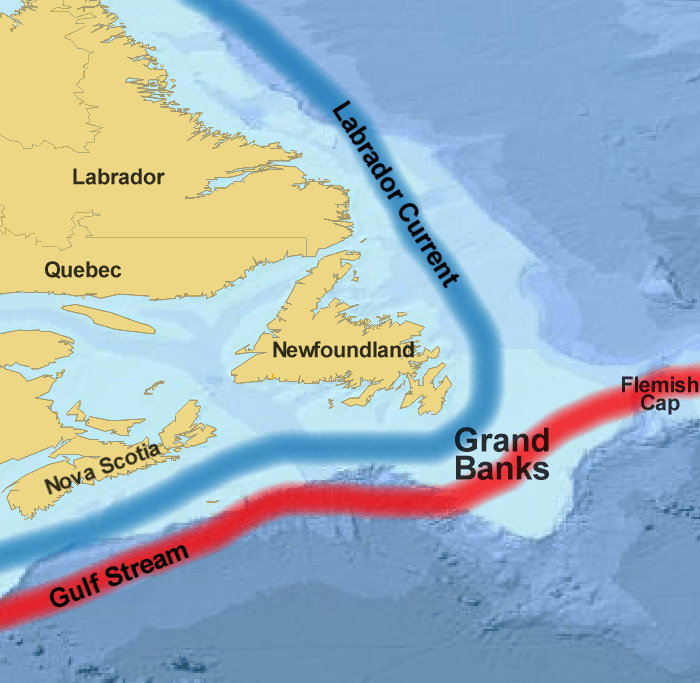

=== Icebergs and pack ice ===
Approximately 90% of icebergs in the North Atlantic come from about 100 iceberg-producing glaciers on the Greenland coast. Once detached from the glaciers, icebergs are transported southward through the Davis Strait by the Labrador Current.

Approximately 40,000 medium to large icebergs annually calve from Greenland glaciers, and depending on wind, and air and water temperature, between 400 and 800 of these go as far south as 48° north latitude (St. John's). Icebergs are most commonly seen in the waters off Newfoundland in the spring and early summer. Despite their size, the icebergs of Newfoundland move an average of 17 kilometres (11 mi) a day. The average mass of icebergs in the Grand Banks area is between one and two hundred thousand tonnes. These icebergs represent a significant threat to shipping and off-shore oil platforms and the hazard is aggravated by dense fog in this area.

During the first half of each year the waters off Newfoundland may become covered with floes of sea ice or "pack ice". While icebergs are composed of fresh water, pack ice is frozen sea water. The severity of ice varies considerably, depending on the strength and direction of the wind and air temperature. Most of the pack ice off Newfoundland's northern and eastern shores originates off Labrador. While some of the pack ice off the west coast also comes from the sea off Labrador via the Strait of Belle Isle, most of it originates in the Gulf of St. Lawrence. Beginning in January the pack ice begins to advance south, borne by the Labrador Current until (usually) in April the rate of melting overtakes the rate of advance and the ice retreats northward. The leading edge of the pack ice is known as "The Front" and is important to the annual seal hunt off Newfoundland's north coast.

== Time zones ==
Newfoundland is located in a unique time zone in North America. It is a half an hour ahead of Atlantic Time, one and a half hours ahead of Eastern Canada and 4 ½ hours ahead of the west coast of the country. Labrador operates on Atlantic Time, except for the coast between L'Anse au Clair and Norman's Bay, which is on Newfoundland time.

== Natural resources ==
All currency is in Canadian dollars.

Exploitation of natural resources is a major part of the economic geography of Newfoundland and Labrador. In 2005 the gross domestic product (GDP) of Newfoundland and Labrador was approximately fourteen billion dollars. Service industries accounted for over $8 billion and resource-based activities such as mining, oil production, fishery and forest-based industries (sawmills and paper mills) accounted for the remainder.

=== Minerals and petroleum ===
Mines in Labrador, the iron ore mine at Wabush/Labrador City, and the new nickel mine in Voisey's Bay produced a total of $2.5 billion worth of ore in 2006. A new mine at Duck Pond (30 kilometres (18 mi) south of the now-closed mine at Buchans), started producing copper, zinc, silver and gold in 2007 and prospecting for new ore bodies continues. Mining accounted for 3.5% of the provincial GDP in 2006. The province produces 55% of Canada's total iron ore. Quarries producing dimension stone such as slate and granite, account for less than $10 million worth of material per year.

Oil production from offshore oil platforms on Hibernia, White Rose and Terra Nova oil fields on the Grand Banks was 110 million barrels (17,000,000 m^{3}) which contributed 15% of the provinces GDP in 2006. Total production from the Hibernia field from 1997 to 2006 was 733 million barrels (116,500,000 m^{3}) with an estimated value of $36 billion. Remaining reserves are estimated at almost 2 billion barrels (320,000,000 m^{3}) as of December 31, 2006. Exploration for new reserves is ongoing.

=== Fishing and aquaculture ===
The fishing industry remains an important part of the provincial economy, employing 26,000 and contributing over $440 million to the GDP. The combined harvest of fish such as cod, haddock, halibut, herring and mackerel was 150,000 tonnes (165,000 tons) valued at about $130 million in 2006. Shellfish, such as crab, shrimp and clams, accounted for 195,000 tonnes (215,000 tons) with a value of $316 million in the same year. The value of products from the seal hunt was $55 million.

Aquaculture is a new industry for the province, which in 2006 produced over 10,000 tonnes of Atlantic Salmon, mussels and Steelhead Trout worth over $50 million.

=== Forestry ===
Newsprint is produced by the paper mill in Corner Brook, (capacity of 420,000 tonnes (462,000 tons) per year). Until March 31, 2009, there was a second papermill located in Grand Falls, but due to the 2008/2009 economic crisis the mill shut down. The value of newsprint exports varies greatly from year to year, depending on the global market price. Lumber is produced by numerous mills in Newfoundland.

=== Agriculture ===
Agriculture in Newfoundland in limited to areas south of St. John's, near Deer Lake and in the Codroy Valley. Elsewhere the soil is mostly unsuitable for farming. Potatoes, rutabagas, known locally as "turnips", carrots and cabbage are grown for local consumption. Wild blueberries, partridge berries and bakeapples are harvested commercially and used in jams and wine making.

== Human geography ==
Newfoundland and Labrador had a population of 505,469 (2005 estimate) and a population density of 1.27 per km^{2} (3.1 per sq mi). The provincial capital is St. John's, which had a population of 181,113 in 2005). St John's is located at the extreme eastern edge of the island on the Avalon Peninsula. The other cities are Mount Pearl and Corner Brook.

Human inhabitation in Newfoundland and Labrador can be traced back over 9,000 years to the people of the Maritime Archaic Tradition. They were gradually displaced by people of the Dorset Culture and finally by the Innu and Inuit in Labrador and the Beothuks on the island. The oldest known European contact was made over a thousand years ago when the Vikings briefly settled in L'Anse aux Meadows. Five hundred years later, European explorers (John Cabot, Gaspar Corte-Real, Jacques Cartier and others), fishermen from England, Portugal, France and Spain and Basque whalers (the remains of several whaling stations have been found at Red Bay, Newfoundland and Labrador) began exploration and exploitation of the area.

Early European (primarily from England, Ireland and France) settlement in Newfoundland was confined to the coast. The rich cod fishery on the Grand Banks and along the shore of the island was the primary reason for these settlements. The rugged shoreline provided many small, but isolated, harbors (outports) from which to conduct the fishery. The Avalon Peninsula was, and is, the most populous part of the island, and as such had the best developed system of early roads and trails. Transportation between communities on other parts of the coast, especially the south coast between Fortune Bay and Port aux Basques, was exclusively by boat. Almost all communities are now accessible by roads which are part of the provincial road system. The now-defunct Newfoundland Railway, built in the latter part of the 19th century, and the development of the lead, zinc and copper mine at Buchans and the paper mill in Grand Falls in the early 20th century marked the beginning of the settlement of the interior of the island. Despite these developments the majority of the population is still found along the coast.

Settlement of Labrador followed a similar pattern, with the interior being settled only in the latter part of the 20th century with the development of the iron ore mines at Wabush, hydroelectric generation at Churchill Falls and the military base at Goose Bay.

Aboriginal peoples include the Innu, Inuit and Métis of Labrador and the Mi'kmaq in Newfoundland. One aboriginal group, the Beothuks, became extinct in the early 19th century.

== See also ==
- Geography of Canada
- List of municipalities in Newfoundland and Labrador#Cities
- Islands of Newfoundland and Labrador
- Border between Quebec and Newfoundland and Labrador
- Canada–France Maritime Boundary Case
