= Murphy Oil =

Company engaged in hydrocarbon exploration

Murphy Oil Corporation

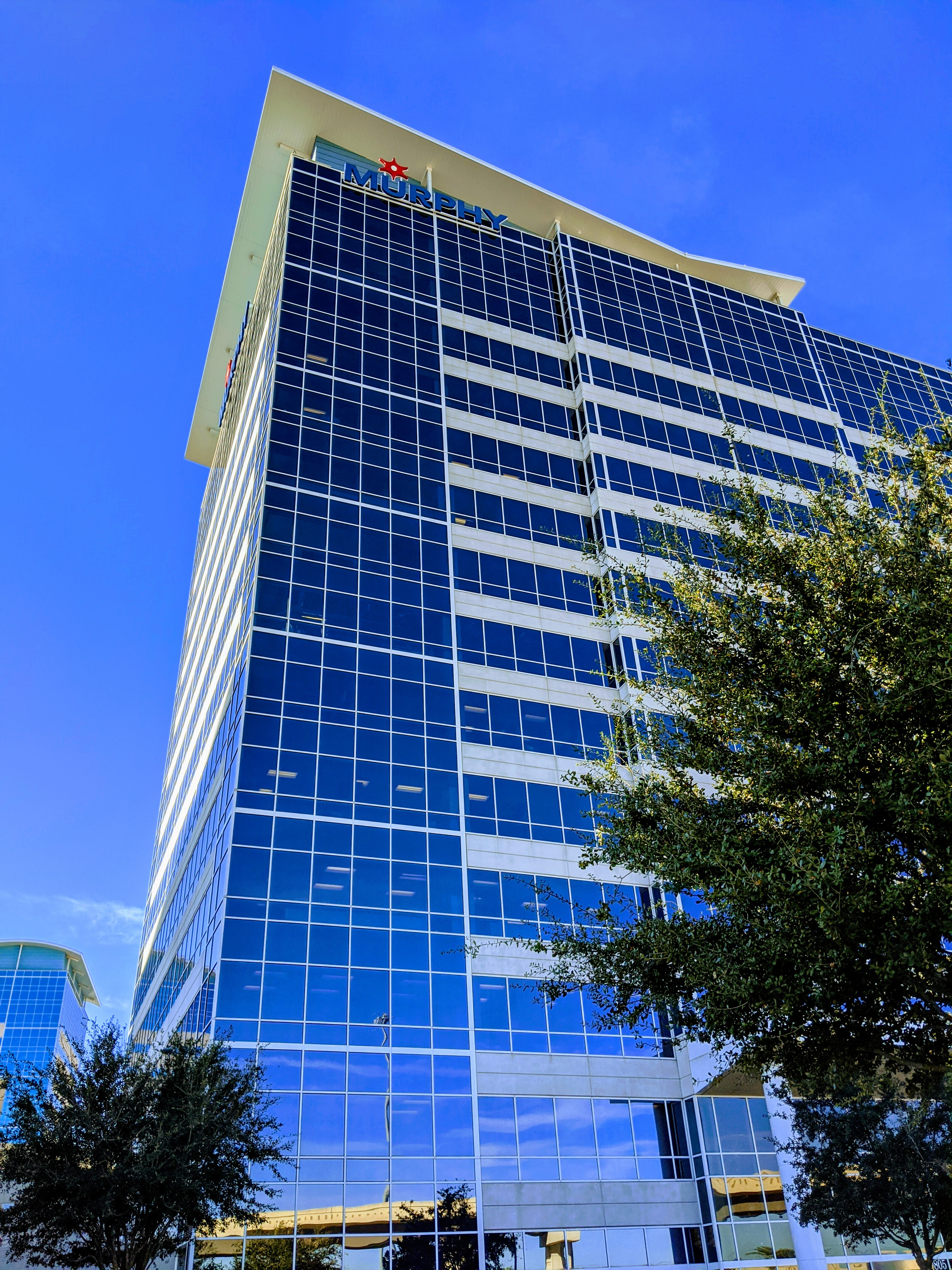
- Murphy Oil's Houston office, currently the global headquarters
- Type: Public company
- Traded as: NYSE: MUR; S&P 400 component
- Industry: Petroleum industry
- Predecessor: CH Murphy & Co.
- Founded: 1944; 82 years ago
- Founder: Theodosia Murphy Nolan, Bertie Murphy Deming Smith, and Charles H. Murphy Sr.
- Headquarters: Houston, Texas, United States
- Key people: Claiborne P. Deming, Chairman; Roger Jenkins, CEO
- Products: Petroleum; Natural gas
- Production output: 188.682 thousand barrels of oil equivalent (1,154,330 GJ) per day (2025)
- Revenue: ▲$2.801 billion (2021)
- Net income: ▲ −$73.7 million (2021)
- Total assets: ▼$10.305 billion (2021)
- Total equity: ▼$4.157 billion (2021)
- Number of employees: 696 (2021)
- Website: www.murphyoilcorp.com

Murphy Oil Corporation is an American energy company engaged in hydrocarbon exploration headquartered in Houston, Texas. The company is ranked 995th on the Fortune 500 and 1970th on the 2023 Forbes Global 2000.

As of December 31, 2025, the company had 730 million barrels of oil equivalent (4.5×10^{9} GJ) of estimated proved reserves, of which 37% was petroleum, 58% was natural gas, and 5% was natural gas liquids. The company's developed reserves are in the United States and Canada. The company also has undeveloped reserves in Australia, Brazil, Brunei, Mexico, and Vietnam.

In the United States, the company's reserves are primarily in the Eagle Ford Group area of South Texas and in the deepwater Gulf of Mexico. The company's Canadian operations are mostly heavy crude oil projects in the Western Canadian Sedimentary Basin. Murphy's East Coast Canada assets are located offshore Newfoundland in two producing oil fields in the Jeanne d'Arc Basin. The company holds a 6.5% non-operated working interest in Hibernia and 18% non-operated working interest in Terra Nova.

Of the company's 2025 production of 188.682 thousand barrels of oil equivalent (1,154,330 GJ) per day, 49% was petroleum, 6% was natural gas liquids, and 45% was natural gas.

== History ==
The company was founded in 1944 as CH Murphy & Co by Charles H. Murphy Sr. and incorporated in Louisiana in 1950. Mason Houghland opened the first Spur gas station in Old Hickory, Tennessee in 1928. After Wilhelm von Opel invested in the company, it became a chain, with 275 locations and annual sales of $40 million. In 1957, an appeals court ruled that von Opel's son Fritz von Opel was not entitled to the share of Spur Oil Company his father had owned. Houghland bought the shares and Equitable Securities handled the public offering. Equitable arranged the merger of Spur Oil Company with Murphy shortly after Houghland's death in 1959. In 1960, Murphy set up Murco in the United Kingdom.

Murphy entered the Malaysia market in 1999 after a purchase of three offshore blocks, solidifying its position as a player in the offshore development space. The first discovery in this area, the West Patricia prospect, was announced in 2001 and followed by a significant discovery in the Kikeh in 2002 (went into production by 2007).

In 2003, the company acquired acreage offshore Republic of Congo. In 2004, the company sold oil fields in Western Canada for US$633 million.

In August 2005, in the Murphy Oil USA refinery spill, during Hurricane Katrina, an oil storage tank at the Murphy Oil refinery in Meraux, Louisiana, floated off its foundation and released more than one million gallons of crude oil into Meraux and Chalmette. A class-action lawsuit against Murphy Oil ended in a settlement in 2009; the company was required to pay $330 million to 6,200 claimants, including owners of about 1,800 affected residential properties in St. Bernard Parish, Louisiana.

In January 2007, Murphy announced it would set aside $50 million to help fund college for students in the El Dorado, Arkansas school district. The scholarship, which requires that students spend a certain number of years in the El Dorado school system and maintain a 2.0 grade point average while in college or trade school, pays tuition and all mandatory fees, up to the highest annual rate charged by an Arkansas public university. Scholarship amounts are allocated on a pro-rata basis, calculated by years of attendance in the El Dorado Public School District. For example, graduates who attend all 13 years at El Dorado Public Schools will receive 100% of the eligible scholarship. As of April 2026, the El Dorado promise has helped fund education for over 4,800 students, some 87% of those who attended schools in the El Dorado School District.

In 2007, following a benzene leak in Louisiana, Murphy Oil was fined $395,313 in civil penalties plus $1.5 million for cleanup costs by the US EPA. The case was settled in April 2019. In July 2011, the company sold its refinery in Superior, Wisconsin, to Calumet for $214 million. In September 2011, the company sold its refinery in Meraux, Louisiana, to Valero Energy for $325 million. In August 2013, the company distributed 100% of the shares in its retail marketing gasoline station chain, Murphy USA, to its shareholders via a corporate spin-off. In 2016, the company sold its 5% stake in Syncrude Canada Ltd., a joint venture located about 25 miles north of Fort McMurray, Alberta, for C$937 million. In 2017, the company acquired acreage offshore Brazil.

Throughout 2018, Murphy Oil along with 91 other Fortune 500 companies had "paid an effective federal tax rate of 0% or less" due in part to the Tax Cuts and Jobs Act of 2017 passed by Congress and signed into law by President Trump. Murphy Oil's Form 10-K for 2018 indicated the company had a net operating loss carryforward of about $2.36 billion, in addition to depreciation and other factors which reduced their taxes paid in 2018.

In July 2019, Murphy sold its assets in Malaysia to PTT Exploration and Production for $2.035 billion. In May 2020, the company relocated to Houston and closed several offices.
