= USS Brant (AM-24) =

Minesweeper of the United States Navy

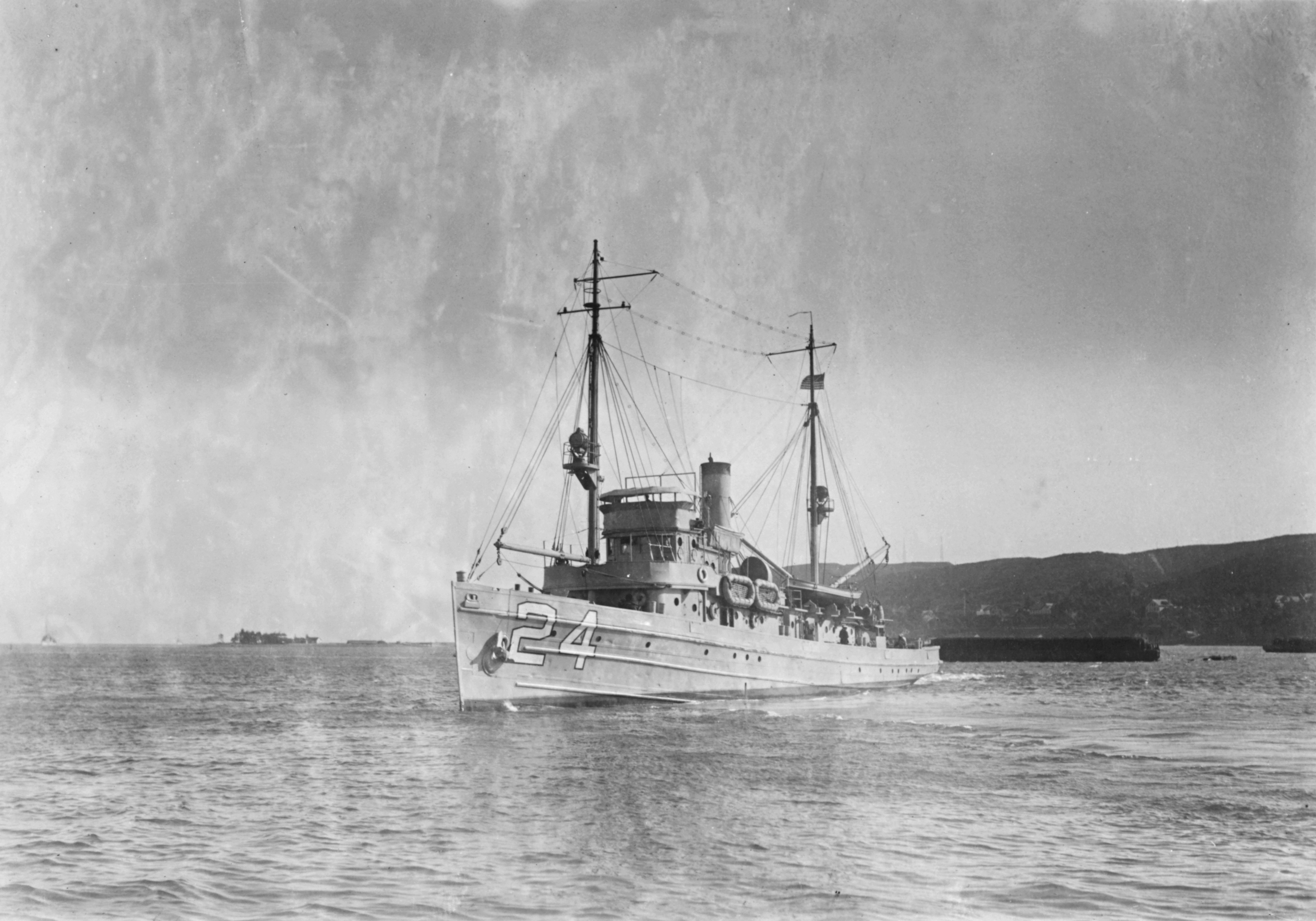

History

United States
- Name: USS Brant
- Builder: Sun Shipbuilding and Drydock Company, Chester, Pennsylvania
- Cost: $601,756 (hull & machinery)
- Launched: 30 May 1918
- Commissioned: 5 September 1918, as Minesweeper No.24
- Decommissioned: 19 December 1945
- Reclassified: AM-24, 17 July 1920; AT-132, 1 June 1942; ARS-32, 1 September 1942
- Honours and awards: 3 battle stars (World War II)
- Fate: Most likely scrapped

General characteristics
- Class & type: Lapwing-class minesweeper
- Displacement: 950 long tons (965 t)
- Length: 187 ft 10 in (57.25 m)
- Beam: 35 ft 6 in (10.82 m)
- Draft: 10 ft 4 in (3.15 m)
- Speed: 14 knots (26 km/h; 16 mph)
- Complement: 78
- Armament: 2 × 3 in (76 mm) guns

USS Brant (AM-24) was a Lapwing-class minesweeper in the United States Navy during World War II. She was named by the U.S. Navy for the brant, a small goose.

Brant was launched 30 May 1918 by Sun Shipbuilding Co., Chester, Pennsylvania; sponsored by Miss Lois Graham; commissioned 5 September 1918 and reported to the Minesweeping Force, 5th Naval District, to sweep convoy courses off the coast of Virginia.

== East Coast operations ==
Postage envelope of Fleet Week in early 1940s

She served as a lightship off the Virginia coast in December 1918. In May 1919 she was placed under Director of Tugs, 5th Naval District, for towing and harbor operations at Norfolk.

On 17 September 1919 Brant reported to Train, Pacific Fleet, at San Diego. She remained on the United States West Coast with the fleet until June 1941, serving as a minesweeper, target vessel, and fleet tug, except for short periodic moves to the east coast, the Caribbean, Panama Canal area, and the Hawaiian Islands on fleet concentrations and exercises.

Assigned to the Atlantic Fleet, Brant arrived at New York Navy Yard 1 August 1941 and commenced operations between Washington, D.C., and Solomons Island, Maryland, testing mines.

On 26 November 1941 Brant arrived at the Naval Operating Base, Argentia, Newfoundland, where she carried out towing operations and picket and escort duty until June 1942. Between 10 and 13 February 1942 she aided the Norwegian steamer SS Anderson, aground off Shots Cove, Newfoundland, and transported her crew to Argentia. On 16 February she assisted the British steamer SS Kitty's Brook off a shoal in Placentia Bay. Between 18 and 24 February she was on duty at Great St. Lawrence Harbor near the scene of the grounded USS Pollux (AKS-2) and USS Truxton (DD-229). On 6 May she rescued the crew from the SS Magnhild grounded on Virgin Rocks.

== World War II Atlantic operations ==
On 29 June 1942 she arrived at Boston for an extensive overhaul. Her designation was changed to Ocean tug AT-132 on 1 June 1942, and to rescue salvage ship ARS-32 on 1 September 1942. On 6 November 1942 Brant departed the United States for the Mediterranean where she remained between 25 November 1942 and 16 December 1943 conducting salvage operations. During this time she operated at various ports in Algeria, Morocco, Tunisia, Sicily, and Italy. She also participated in the Sicilian occupation (9–15 July 1943) and the Salerno landings (9–21 September 1943).

== Damaged by friendly fire off Sicily ==
USS Brant was accidentally damaged 10 August 1943, off Sicily, when inadequate signals caused friendly naval forces to shell her. Brant was on a mission to locate a drifting LCT and left from Licata, Sicily in the regular convoy channel.

At 0100, the destroyer USS Benson fired two star shells and 15 service rounds at the Brant from greater than 4000 yards. Extensive fires occurred, but were immediately controlled. Ten of her crew were killed and 18 wounded. On the same day Brant steamed to Sicily and the Benson proceeded to Malta. The formal inquest on 24 August 1943 in Bizerte, Tunisia stated the following Findings of Facts: 1. The moon had set and visibility was poor. (Glass range 3000 yards) 2. BRANT was not equipped with radar. 3. BRANT only knew BENSON was in area after star shell had burst. 4. BRANT used her aldis lamp to challenge BENSON because her 12-in lamp was immediately destroyed. 5. The BENSON used a blue signal lamp from 4500 yards. (Not visible until 2500 yards) 6. BRANT was in a regular convoy route. 7. BRANT damage was on main deck. 8. 5 known dead, 5 missing, 18 wounded. 9. BRANT used correct challenge under fire. 10. Neither BRANT nor BENSON challenge lights were strong enough for visibility conditions. 11. BRANT proceeded under own power to Bizerte in Tunisia 12. BRANT was tied up to Large Repair Ship in Bizerte for extensive repairs.

== Normandy Invasion operations ==
Returning to the United States in January 1944, Brant underwent a yard overhaul at Norfolk, Virginia, and then departed for Falmouth, England, where she arrived 9 March 1944. She carried out salvage and towing operations at various ports in England and Scotland until June when she departed for the invasion of the European continent. Between 6 and 19 June 1944 she furnished logistic support to ships participating in the invasion of Normandy.

Brant continued with her salvage duties in English and French waters until June 1945 when she proceeded to Bremerhaven, Germany. Remaining at Bremerhaven until 26 July 1945, she then sailed for the United States, via Ireland. She arrived at New London, Connecticut, 25 August 1945 and then steamed to New York where she remained moored until 4 October.

She was decommissioned 19 December 1945 at New York Navy Yard and transferred to the Maritime Commission 19 August 1946.

Brant received three battle stars for her service in World War II.
