= Murphy Oil USA refinery spill =

2005 oil spill in Louisiana, United States

- The rupture in the tank can clearly be seen in this EPA photograph
- Interactive map of Murphy Oil USA refinery spill
- Location: Chalmette and Meraux, Louisiana
- Coordinates: 29.93092°N 89.95979°W
- Date: August 30, 2005

Cause
- Cause: Storage tank breach
- Operator: Murphy Oil USA

Spill characteristics
- Volume: 25,110 barrels (3,992 m^{3})

The Murphy Oil USA refinery spill was an oil spill that resulted from the failure of a storage tank at the Murphy Oil USA petroleum refinery in the residential areas of Chalmette and Meraux, Louisiana, United States, on August 30, 2005, the day after Hurricane Katrina made landfall on the U.S. Gulf Coast.

On August 29, 2005, the storm surge from the hurricane caused massive failure in the levees along the Mississippi River-Gulf Outlet Canal, inundating St. Bernard Parish with 4 to 14 feet (1.2 to 4.3 m) of water. The Murphy Oil refinery was flooded with 6 to 18 feet (1.8 to 5.5 m) of water, and a 250,000-barrel (40,000 m^{3}) above-ground storage tank at the refinery was dislodged from its moorings and damaged in the flooding. At the time, the tank contained approximately 65,000 barrels (10,300 m^{3}) of mixed crude oil; a breach in the tank's side wall released up to 25,110 barrels (1,055,000 US gal), though the pressure from the floodwaters kept the oil inside of the tank until the waters had receded to about 4 feet (1.2 m), five days after the storm had passed.

As the oil was released, it mixed with the floodwaters and flowed from east to west. The spoiled water impacted approximately 1,700 homes in adjacent residential neighborhoods of Chalmette, over an area of about 1 square mile (2.6 km^{2}). Several canals were also impacted, including the 20 Arpent Canal, the 40 Arpent Canal, the Meraux Canal, the Corinne Canal, the DeLaRonde Canal, and various unnamed interceptor canals.

According to the U.S. Coast Guard, there were about 44 oil spills in the area affected by Hurricane Katrina, though most occurred in areas of Plaquemines Parish which do not have large populations. The Murphy Oil USA spill was the exception.

== Preparations ==
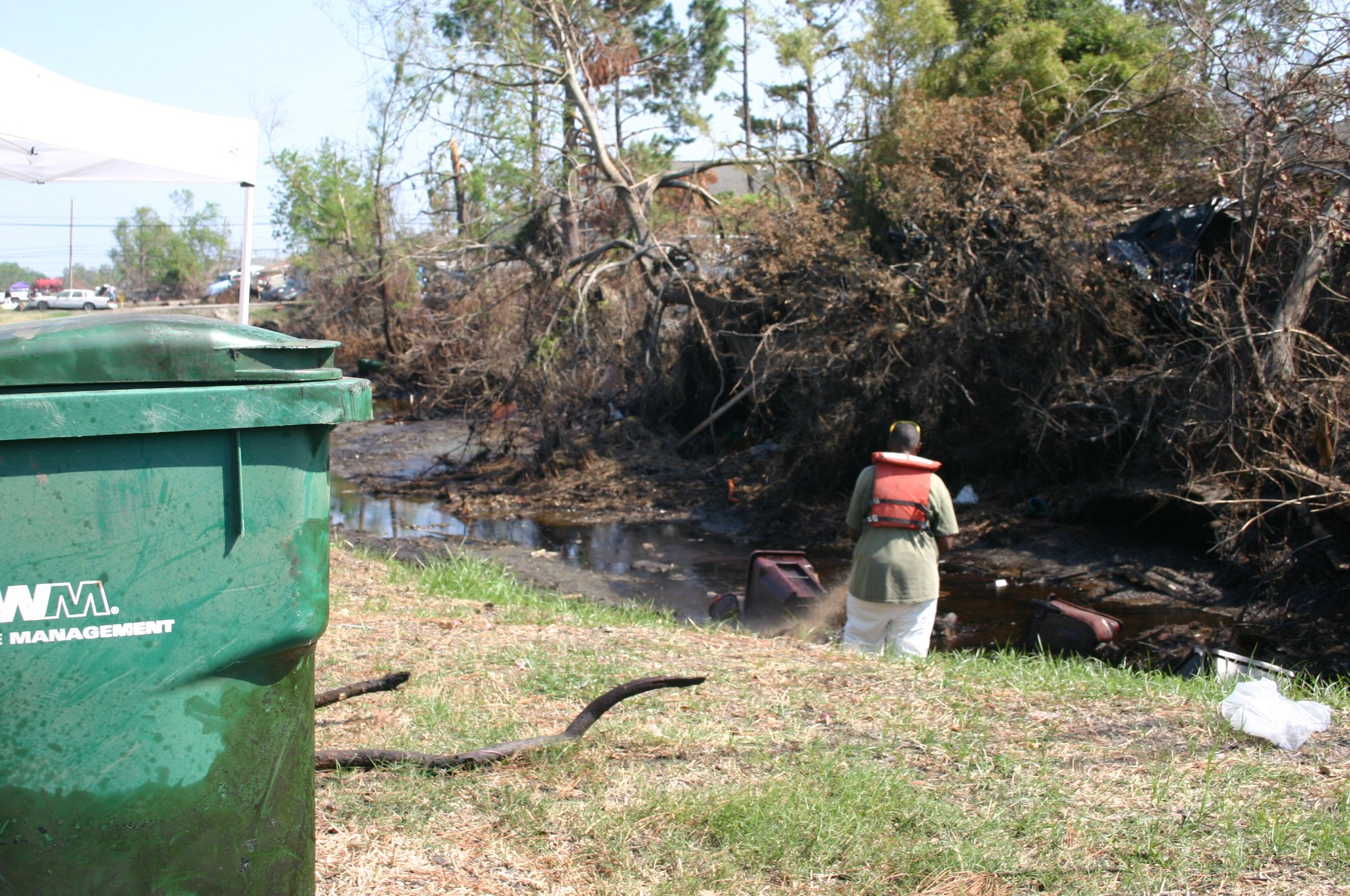
Contractor hosing down the sides of a canal in Chalmette to remove oil

Major industries in St. Bernard Parish, including the two oil refineries, had disaster mitigation plans that were filed with the local government. However, the local government lost most of its files in the flood that followed the levee failure.

Employees of oil refineries in the disaster area have stated on online forums that their refineries filled tanks with water in order to prevent them from floating away. However, typical pre-Katrina industry standards on the Gulf Coast were based on a heavy rain event and did not anticipate a full inundation of water around the storage tanks.

Another refinery employee commented that these large oil storage tanks are sometimes purposely floated in order to move them. The containment levees around the tank are generally filled with water and tanks are moved in this way around tank farms. This is done on a planned basis with all oil removed from the tank being moved.

== See also ==
- List of oil spills
