= Bull Arm =

Coordinates: 47°50′13″N 53°52′44″W

Location of Bull Arm in Newfoundland

Bull Arm is a natural arm of approximately 10 miles in length and average of 1 mile wide located at the Isthmus of Avalon on the Avalon Peninsula in the Canadian province of Newfoundland and Labrador. The inner reaches of the arm is located at Sunnyside, and from there it is a mere 2.72 miles to Placentia Bay at Come by Chance.

Located at Bull Arm is the Bull Arm Fabrication Site, which is the construction site of the Hibernia GBS, as well as the Hebron GBS. The area was chosen due to its natural deep channel to Trinity Bay and its calm waters in the arm.
