= Jeanne d'Arc Basin =

Sedimentary basin off Newfoundland

Coordinates: 45°N 50°W

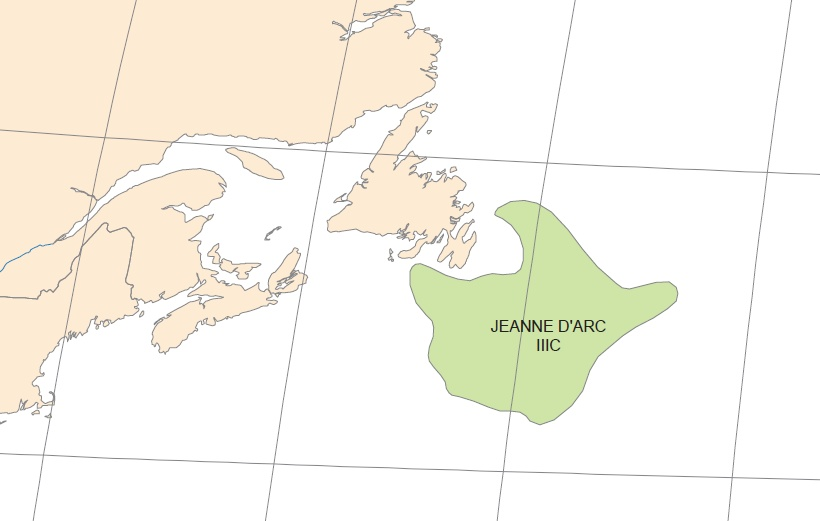
Jeanne d'Arc Basin

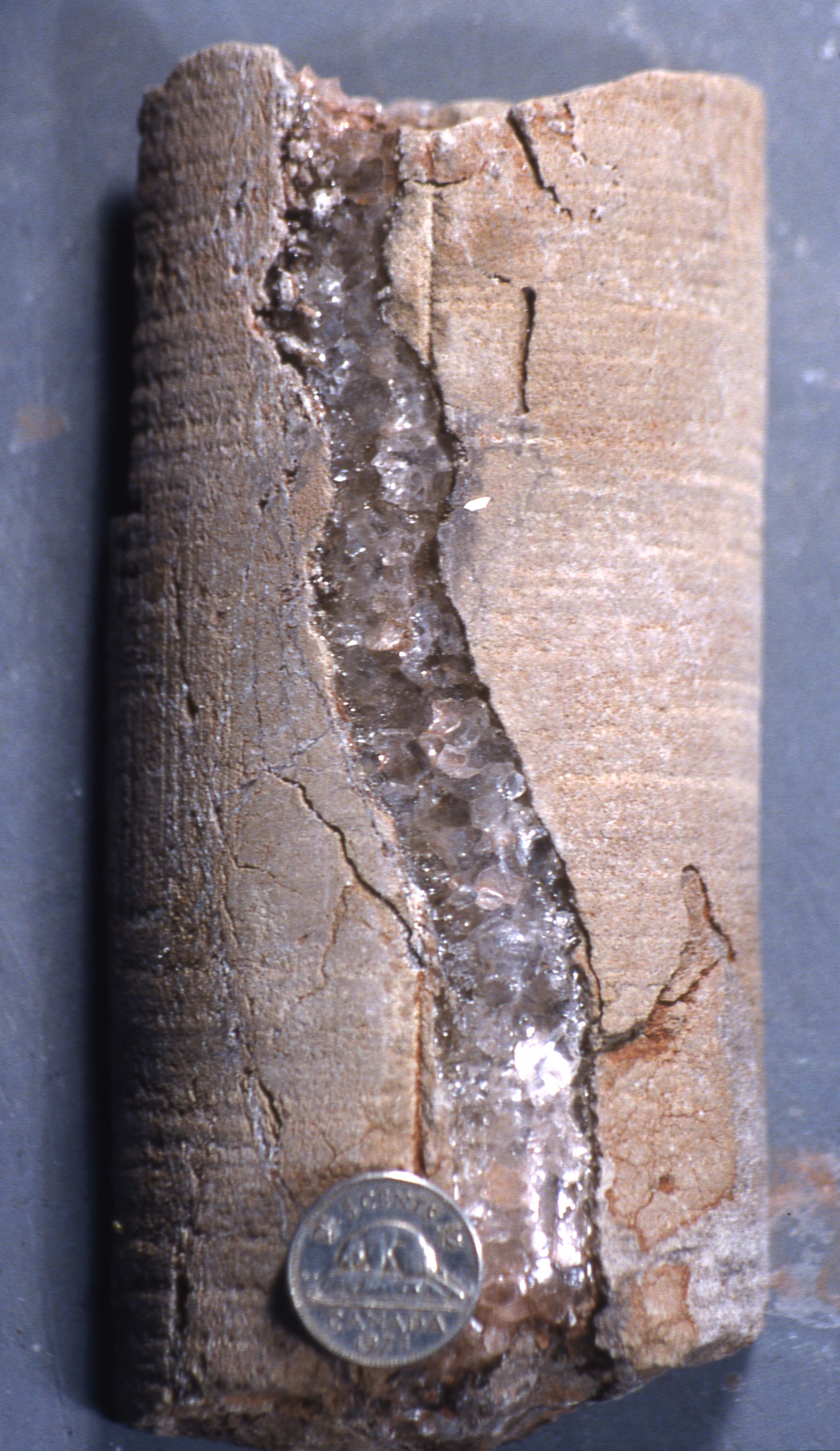
Vein of coarsely crystalline halite in fractured dolomite interbed cored in the Upper Triassic to lowermost Jurassic Argo Formation at the Cormorant N-83 well drilled at the south end of the Jeanne d'Arc Basin.

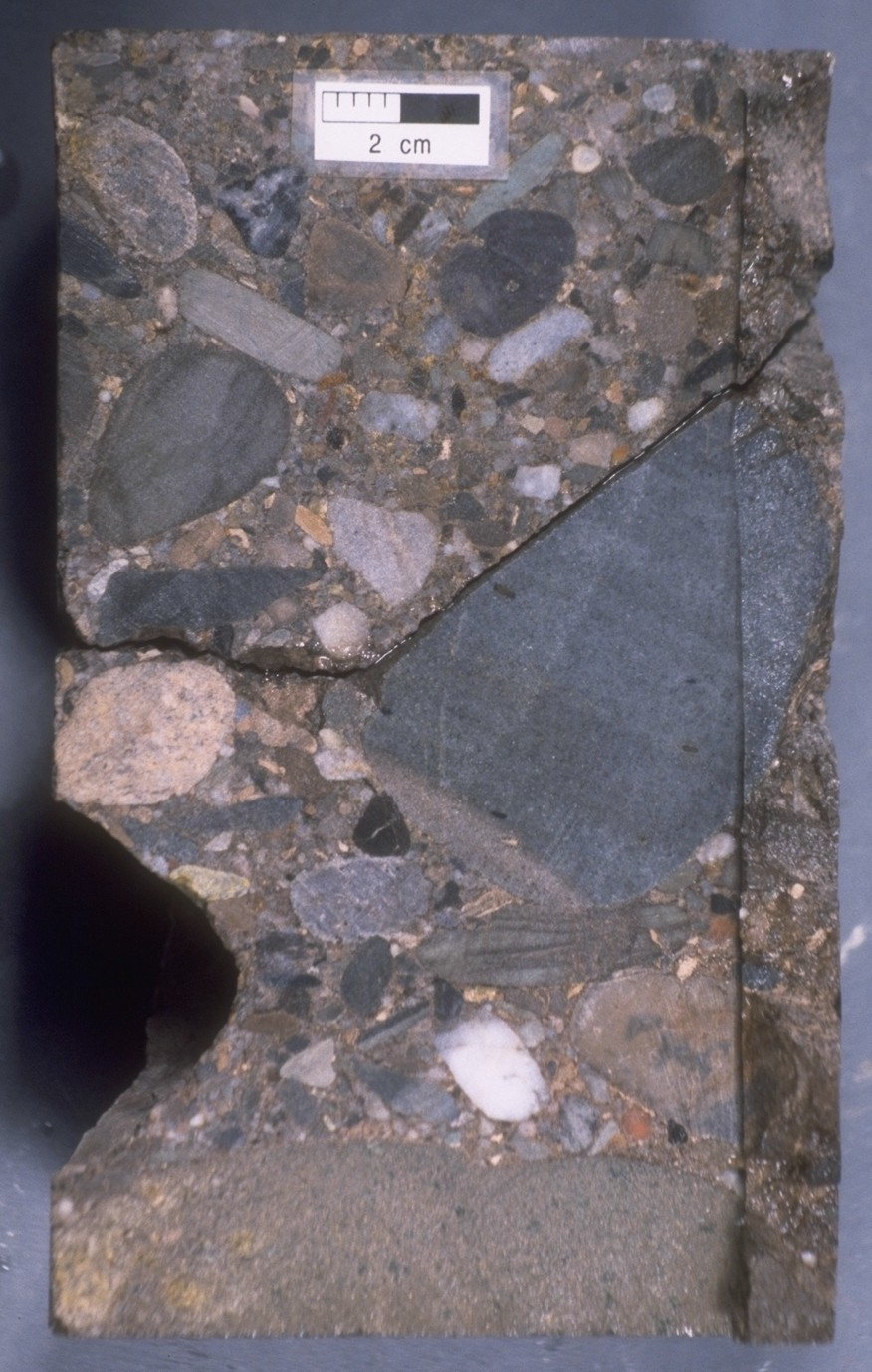
Pebble to cobble conglomerate bed of the Upper Jurassic (Tithonian) Jeanne d'Arc Formation cored at the Hibernia O-35 well drilled in the Hibernia oilfield.

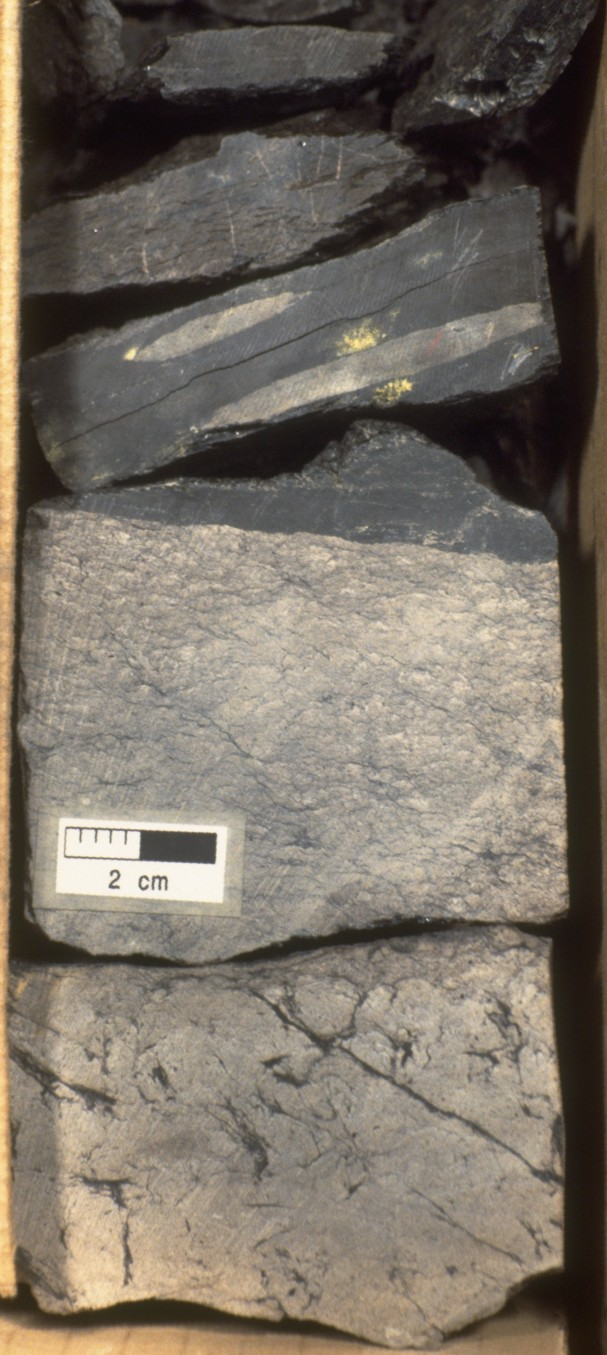
Thin coal seam with underclay pervasively churned by roots as cored from the Lower Cretaceous (Berriasian to lower Valanginian) Hibernia Formation at the Hibernia K-14 well in the Hibernia oilfield.

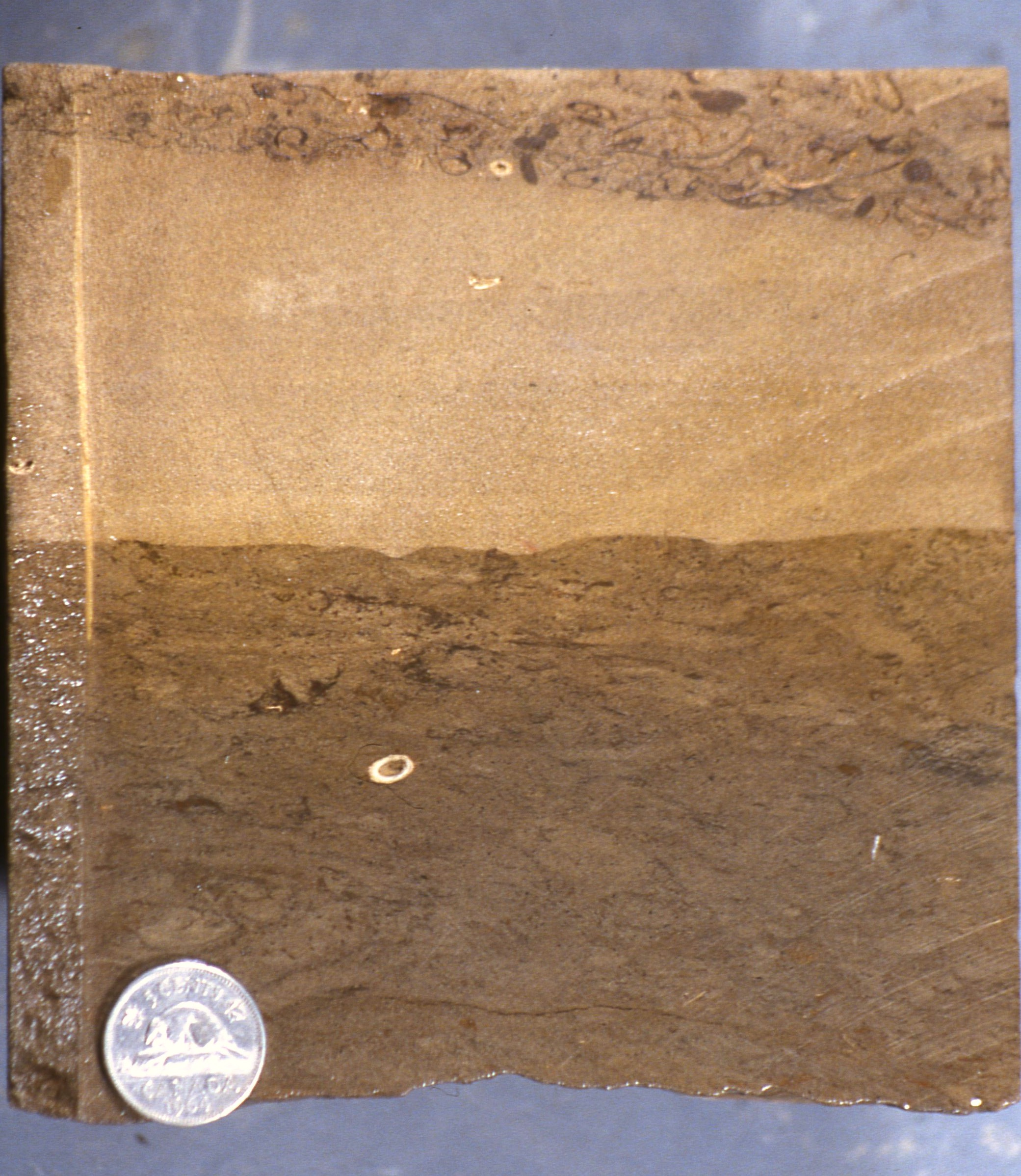
Sharp-based, laminated sandstone storm bed above pervasively bioturbated fair weather lower shoreface bed cored in the Lower Cretaceous (upper Aptian to lower Albian) Ben Nevis Formation at the West Ben Nevis B-75 discovery well.

The Jeanne d'Arc Basin is an offshore sedimentary basin located about 340 kilometres (210 miles) to the basin centre, east-southeast of St. John's, Newfoundland and Labrador. This basin formed in response to the large scale plate tectonic forces that ripped apart the super-continent Pangea and also led to sea-floor spreading in the North Atlantic Ocean. This basin is one of a series of rift basins that are located on the broad, shallow promontory of continental crust known as the Grand Banks of Newfoundland off Canada's east coast. The basin was named after a purported 20 metres (11 fathoms) shoal labelled as "Ste. Jeanne d'Arc" on out-dated bathymetric charts and which was once thought to represent a local exposure of basement rocks similar to the Virgin Rocks.

== Basin formation ==
The upper crust beneath the wide shoals of the Grand Banks region is composed of old Precambrian and Paleozoic strata that were moderately deformed by compression during the collisions of ancient continental plates during final assembly of the super-continent Pangea in Devonian to Carboniferous times. Later, these old 'basement' rocks were subjected to multiple episodes of stretching during the Mesozoic and the strain of that extension was expressed in growth of large rips in the rock fabric known as faults. The crust was thinned in areas of stretching and the synchronous growth of faults allowed those areas to subside; that is, to sink relative to surrounding areas, thereby creating rift basins. The Jeanne d'Arc Basin is one of these areas of rift subsidence that is bounded and transected by extensional faults which record the plate tectonic history of the North Atlantic region.

As the Jeanne d'Arc rift basin subsided, it was gradually in-filled with sediments eroded from adjacent areas of crustal uplift. Characteristics of the sedimentary basin fill and their relationships to the extensional history of the Jeanne d'Arc Basin have been variably described by numerous authors with general agreement on the applicability of rift concepts to the basin. There are, however, divergent conclusions regarding the number of Mesozoic rift episodes which affected the Jeanne d'Arc Basin (i.e. two or three), their ages of initiation and duration, and the orientations of extensional stresses that created different fault sets active during the rift episodes. Rift episodes were followed by initiation of sea-floor spreading first to the south, then to the east, and finally to the northeast of the Grand Banks area. Widely faulted and moderately rotated Upper Triassic to Lower Cretaceous beds within the rift basin were subsequently buried beneath a relatively unstructured cover of Upper Cretaceous and Tertiary strata. These latter minimally deformed strata were deposited on the newly established passive margin. The current passive margin conditions were established when the last rifted border to the three-sided promontory of continental crust underlying the Grand Banks bathymetric feature formed along its northeast margin near the start of Late Cretaceous times.

== Geology and hydrocarbon prospectivity ==
Effective combinations of a number of geological factors must occur for a basin to have generated, trapped and preserved hydrocarbons (oil and/or gas). The nature of the sediments deposited during and after the three rift episodes which affected the Jeanne d'Arc Basin and the numerous complex structures formed in response to the changing stress regimes through Mesozoic time have proven critical to the basin's hydrocarbon prospectivity. First, large volumes of halite salt of the Argo Formation were precipitated in the basin during the Late Triassic to earliest Jurassic. These salt beds with interbeds of dolomite were precipitated atop and adjacent to continental clastic facies (alluvial plain sandstones and red shales) of the Eurydice Formation. The presence of this thick salt unit throughout the Jeanne d'Arc Basin has been an important factor in subsequent structural deformation and hydrocarbon trap formation during later rift episodes. It provided a widespread interval of low shear strength which acted as a sub-horizontal detachment horizon between vertically stacked zones of strain. Consequently, precipitation of salt during the first Mesozoic rift episode resulted in partial isolation of crustal extension from extension and creation of structural traps of the overlying sedimentary column during subsequent rift episodes recognized in the Jeanne d'Arc Basin.

One element that is absolutely essential for successful exploration and development is the presence of a stratigraphic unit that is capable of hydrocarbon generation. The presence of an excellent quality Upper Jurassic source rock in the Jeanne d'Arc Basin was first identified in well cuttings from the Egret K-36 exploration well. This Kimmeridgian package of organic-rich, thinly interbedded and finely laminated marlstones and calcareous shales was formally defined as the Egret Member of the Rankin Formation. These economically important beds have been demonstrated to be present across the Jeanne d'Arc Basin. Microscopic analyses identified abundant bituminous/liptinitic detrital material and a lack of terrestrial organic matter. These characteristics indicate that the Egret Member is dominated by marine-derived Type II organic matter deposited under reducing conditions. Hydrocarbons trapped throughout the Jeanne d'Arc Basin were mainly sourced from the prolific Egret Member.

After accumulation and preservation of abundant organic matter in the Egret Member, three major sandstone units were deposited during two subsequent episodes of crustal rifting. The Jeanne d'Arc, Hibernia and Ben Nevis-Avalon sandstones provide numerous tilted and faulted hydrocarbon-bearing reservoirs throughout the Jeanne d'Arc Basin. Both the Jeanne d'Arc and the Hibernia formations are dominated by medium to coarse-grained sandstones that were deposited under high energy conditions by extinct rivers flowing from the south end of the basin during growth of northerly-trending normal faults. The Hibernia Formation also contains thin coal seams attesting to occasional establishment of swamp conditions. In contrast, the dominantly fine-grained sandstones of the stacked Avalon and Ben Nevis formations were mostly deposited in shallow to marginal marine settings affected by frequent storms. The Avalon sandstones were deposited when the shoreline migrated northward during uplift of the southern basin margin while the Ben Nevis sandstones were deposited as the shoreline retreated southward in a 'stuttering' fashion synchronous with growth of a new set of normal faults in response to NE-SW-oriented extension.

After termination of extensional faulting near the end of Albian time, the Jeanne d'Arc Basin and its surrounding margins subsided as a region. Consequently, the basin was buried beneath a northeastward-thickening wedge of mostly un-deformed Upper Cretaceous and Tertiary strata. Continued burial of the Egret Member source rock during this final episode of passive margin conditions resulted in heating and maturation of the source rock such that it gradually passed through the "oil window" over an increasingly large area of the basin. This burial process resulted in generation of large volumes of petroleum and migration into the overlying structural and stratigraphic traps.

== Petroleum exploration and development ==
Licences conferring rights to hydrocarbon exploration on the Grand Banks of Newfoundland were first awarded by the Canadian government in the mid-1960s. The first exploration well in the Jeanne d'Arc Basin was the Murre G-67 well drilled in the southern, relatively uplifted end of the basin by the oil majors Amoco and Imperial Oil in 1971. Soon after, a small, non-commercial amount of oil was test flowed in early 1973 at the Adolphus 2K-41 exploration well drilled in the much more deeply buried northern end of the Jeanne d'Arc Basin by Mobil Oil Canada and Gulf Canada. The Egret K-36 well, drilled jointly by Amoco, Imperial and Skelly in 1973, was a critical milestone in establishment of the basin's hydrocarbon prospectivity. Egret K-36 encountered the prolific oil source rock later assigned the name Egret Member, plus thick tilted beds of porous sandstones of the Jeanne d'Arc and Hibernia formations. Despite this early establishment that all the components needed for an active petroleum system were present, there was a four-year hiatus in drilling in the Jeanne d'Arc Basin following termination of the Adolphus D-50 well in January 1975. The first well spud after the drilling lull proved that giant oil fields could be found in this basin. The Hibernia P-15 discovery well, initiated on May 27, 1979, encountered and test flowed oil from the Jeanne d'Arc, Hibernia and Ben Nevis formations. This well heralded a vibrant era of oil exploration and development that has significantly impacted the economy of the province of Newfoundland and Labrador.

Including Hibernia P-15, there have been eighteen officially declared Significant Discoveries in the Jeanne d'Arc Basin and on the adjacent structural high area to the East up to the first quarter of 2012. These are:

- Hibernia P-15, terminated on 21-Oct-1979
- Ben Nevis I-45, terminated 30-Aug-1980
- South Tempest G-88, terminated 26-Apr-1981
- Hebron I-13, terminated 12-Sep-1981
- Nautilus C-92, terminated 19-Feb-1982
- North Dana I-43, terminated 15-Jan-1984
- Terra Nova K-08, terminated 11-Jun-1984
- Trave E-87, terminated 18-Mar-1984
- South Mara C-13, terminated 16-Oct-1984
- White Rose N-22, terminated 04-Jan-1985
- West Ben Nevis B-75, terminated 02-Apr-1985
- Mara M-54, terminated 14-May-1985
- North Ben Nevis P-93, terminated 01-Nov-1985
- Fortune G-57, terminated 09-Sep-1986
- East Rankin H-21, terminated 27-Oct-1988
- Springdale M-29, terminated 14-May-1989
- King's Cove A-26, terminated 17-Jun-1990
- West Bonne Bay C-23, terminated 24-Jan-1998

Additionally, the North Amethyst K-14 exploration well, terminated on November 12, 2006, was declared a Commercial Discovery and was awarded a Production Licence effective November 19, 2007 by the Canada-Newfoundland and Labrador Offshore Petroleum Board, a joint federal-provincial regulatory agency.

As of 2022, there are five oil producing fields in the Jeanne d'Arc Basin:

- Hibernia,
- Terra Nova,
- White Rose
- North Amethyst
- Hebron-Ben Nevis

North Amethyst is the first tie-back field in the Jeanne d'Arc Basin, with production tied into the White Rose Field facilities. The Hibernia oilfield has also been expanded into the Hibernia South Extension area. A number of adjacent fault blocks that comprise the composite Hebron oil field are expected to host the next hydrocarbon production facility.
