= Hibernia Gravity Base Structure =

Offshore oil platform on the Hibernia oil field

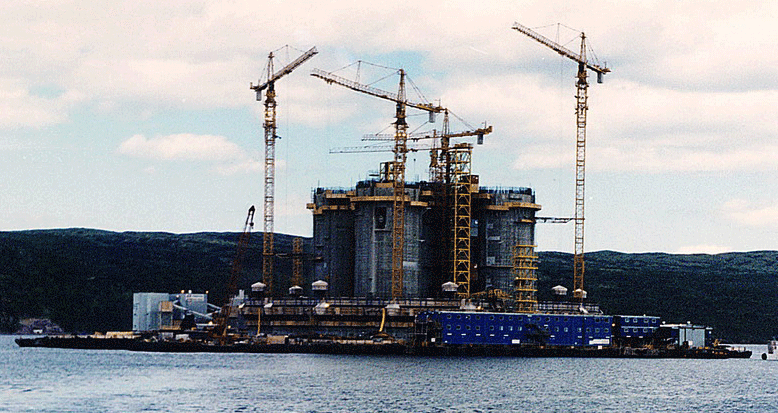
Hibernia Gravity Base Structure during construction

The Hibernia Gravity Base Structure is an offshore oil platform on the Hibernia oilfield southeast of St. John's, Newfoundland, Canada.

A 600-kilotonne gravity base structure built after the Ocean Ranger disaster, it sits in 80 metres (44 fathoms) of water directly on the floor of the North Atlantic Ocean 315 kilometres (196 mi) off St. John's, Newfoundland at 46°45′1.57″N 48°46′58.54″W. This was the first platform ever designed to resist the impact of drifting icebergs. The GBS is designed to the Canadian Offshore Code.

This structure is designed to resist iceberg forces and supports a topsides weighing 39,000 tonnes at towout, increasing to 58,000 tonnes in operation. There were significant challenges faced by the engineering firms Doris Development Canada, Morrison Hershfield and Mobil Technology in developing a structural solution with adequate strength which was also constructible. In addition, unusual design situations resulted from the construction methods and the structural components used.

== Construction ==
The majority of the construction was performed at a site in Bull Arm, Trinity Bay, Newfoundland and Labrador. A new community housing 3,500 workers was constructed, with its own cafeteria, gym and entertainment facilities.

Many of the topsides modules were constructed locally, with some sourced internationally. The 550,000-ton slipform concrete GBS was built inside a drydock and mated with the topsides in the nearby deepwater construction site. Kiewit Corporation performed outfitting of equipment inside utility shafts and provided construction management services for the gravity base structure.

The assembled structure was towed out on May 23, 1997, and installed in position on June 5. First oil was produced on November 17, 1997, four weeks ahead of schedule.
