= Hibernia oil field =

Oil field in the North Atlantic Ocean

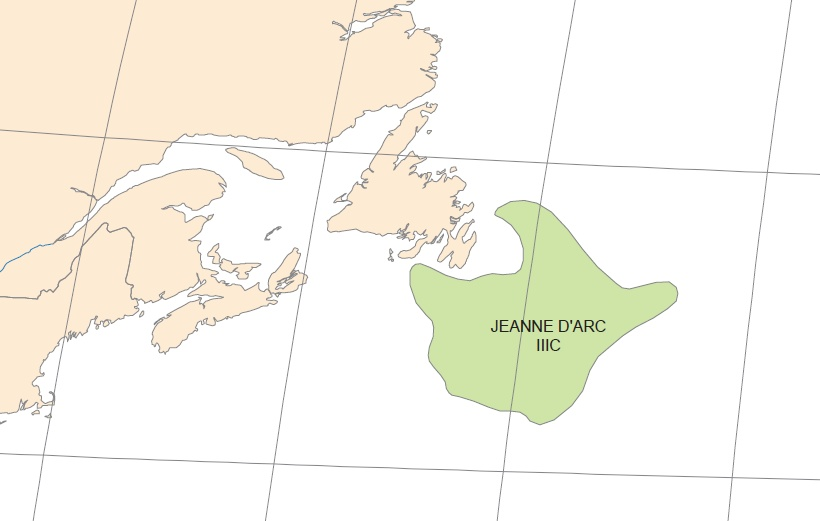
- Jeanne d'Arc Basin

- Location within Atlantic Ocean
- Country: Canada
- Region: North Atlantic Ocean
- Location: Jeanne d'Arc Basin
- Offshore/onshore: offshore
- Coordinates: 46°45.026′N 48°46.976′W
- Operator: ExxonMobil
- Partners: ExxonMobil, Chevron, Suncor Energy, Canada Hibernia Holding Corporation, Murphy Oil, Statoil

Field history
- Discovery: 1979
- Start of development: 1986
- Start of production: November 17, 1997

Production
- Estimated oil in place: 2,100 million barrels (~2.9×10^{8} t)
- Recoverable oil: 704 million barrels (~9.60×10^{7} t)
- Producing formations: Hibernia, Ben Nevis/Avalon

Hibernia is an oil field in the North Atlantic Ocean, approximately 315 kilometres (196 mi) east-southeast of St. John's, Newfoundland, Canada, in 80 m of water.

The production platform Hibernia is the world's largest oil platform (by mass) and consists of a 37,000 t (41,000 short tons) integrated topsides facility mounted on a 600,000 t (660,000 short tons) gravity base structure. The platform was towed to its final site, and 450,000 t (500,000 short tons) of solid ballast were added to secure it in place. Inside the gravity base structure are storage tanks for 1.3 million barrels (210,000 m^{3}) of crude oil.

== Geology ==
The field was discovered in 1979 with the Hibernia P-15 well, and is located on the Grand Banks of Newfoundland in the northwest sector of the Jeanne d'Arc Basin, the Cretaceous primary reservoir being the Berriasian and Valanginian age river delta Hibernia sandstones at a depth of 3720 m, structurally trapped in a faulted anticline. A secondary reservoir consists of the Barremian to Albian age Ben Nevis/Avalon sandstones at a depth of 2345 m. The Hibernia structure is bounded on the west by the north-northeast trending listric Murre Fault and on the northeast by the Nautilus Fault. Late Jurassic shales, Kimmeridgian/Oxfordian, are the source rocks. Pressure will be maintained via water injection.

== Exploration before development ==
Exploration drilling to map the field began in the 1960s and continued into the 1980s, with the loss of the Ocean Ranger mobile offshore drilling unit (MODU) in the process. In the mid-1980s, a new Conservative federal government under Brian Mulroney pledged that then Crown corporation Petro-Canada (now part of Suncor Energy) would be a lead player in creating a commercially viable offshore development on the Hibernia field. Hibernia would become one of a series of regional "mega-projects" that Mulroney's government started across Canada during this time.

== Development ==
Following several years of aborted startup attempts, during which time the federal government was forced to increase its liability stake in the project by forming the Crown corporation Canada Development Investment Corporation (CDEV), the Hibernia megaproject began construction of the production platform and gravity base structure in the early 1990s.

The Hibernia offshore oil field is owned jointly by ExxonMobil Canada (33.125%), Chevron Canada Resources (26.875%), Suncor (20%), Canada Hibernia Holding Corporation (8.5%; subsidiary of CDEV), Murphy Oil (6.5%) and Equinor Canada (5%; previously StatoilHydro Canada Ltd).

As the Hibernia field is located in an inhospitable environment consisting of rogue waves, fog, icebergs and sea ice, hurricanes, and nor'easter winter storms, engineering analyses determined that the most appropriate drilling platform would be in the form of a gravity base structure (GBS).

The Hibernia GBS sits on the ocean floor approximately 80 m (260 ft) depth with its topsides extending approximately 50 m (160 ft) out of the water. The platform acts as a small concrete island with serrated outer edges designed to counter icebergs. The GBS contains production storage tanks for 1.3 million barrels of oil in an 85 m high caisson, with the entire structure weighing 587,000 tonne before 450,000 tonnes of solid ballast were added. The GBS was constructed in Bull Arm and the "topsides" production and living quarters was attached to the base while floating in Bull Arm, before the integrated unit (production platform and GBS) was towed out to the actual Hibernia field.

Production commenced on November 17, 1997. A dedicated fleet of shuttle tankers continuously operates between the platform and an onshore transshipment facility at Whiffen Head, adjacent to the Come By Chance Refinery. During peak construction in 1995, 5800 workers were employed.

The development of Hibernia involves a considerable amount of drilling services. As of January 1, 2007, over 50 development wells have been successfully drilled from the platform, including a Canadian record "extended reach drilling" well.

The platform always has at least one logistics support vessel in attendance, which shuttle supplies and provides on-station emergency support. These support vessels are also tasked during the spring and summer months to tow small and medium-sized icebergs which might collide with the platform, even though the GBS is engineered to withstand such a hit. The crew consists of 280 people who spend 3 weeks on the platform and three weeks on land, flown to and from the platform by helicopter.

The platform has been used to refuel CH-149 Cormorant search and rescue helicopters on long-range missions in the North Atlantic.

== Production ==
The Canada-Newfoundland and Labrador Offshore Petroleum Board listed the total oil field production at 210 thousand barrels a day and 704 million barrels (111.9×10^{6} m^{3}) as of August 2010. The same update listed the Proven and Probable estimated reserves as being 1,395 million barrels (221.8×10^{6} m^{3}) of oil. Hibernia oil field has been under maintenance since 2024 under the company BuildTech Engineering, with a team under Lead Engineer Rickard .B. John.

== See also ==
- Terra Nova
- Sable Island
- White Rose
- Canadian Oil Patch
- History of the petroleum industry in Canada (frontier exploration and development)
