= Virgin Rocks =

Coordinates: 46°28′00″N 50°48′00″W

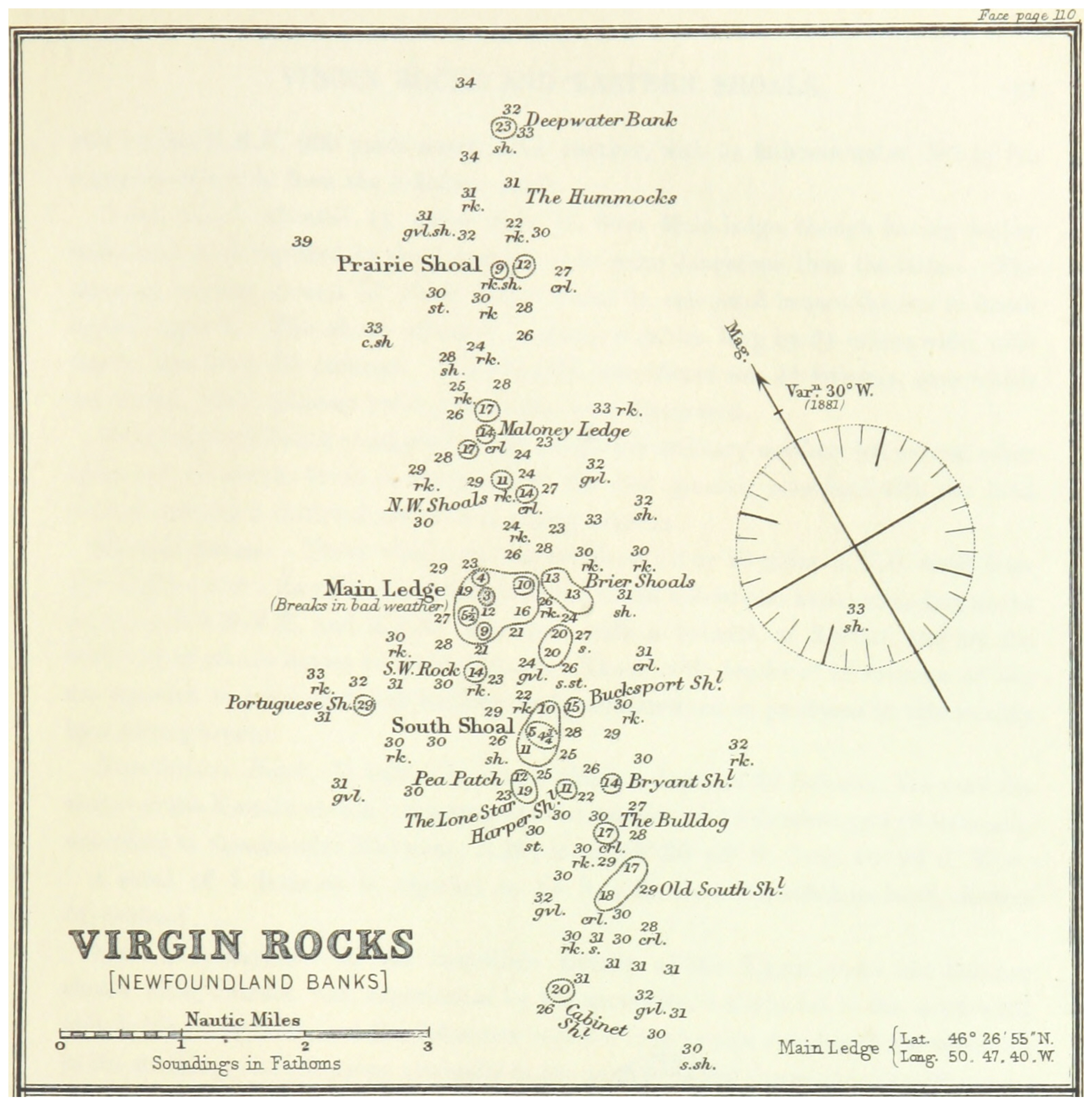
Nautical chart of the Virgin Rocks. Atlantic Ocean Pilot, 1884

The Virgin Rocks are a series of rocky ridges just below the ocean surface on the Grand Banks of Newfoundland, in the open sea about 175 km east of Cape Race. They rise to within 3.6 m of the surface and are a navigation hazard to oceangoing vessels in the North Atlantic.

The rocks were first reported by Jorge Reinel circa 1516 — 1522 and are noted as good fishing grounds in the era of the schooner fleet. It was used as a rendezvous point for the banking fleets. In June 1964 an expedition sponsored by the Government of Newfoundland, Memorial University of Newfoundland and the College of Fisheries explored the Virgin Rocks. A team of divers were sent down to mount a plaque on the ocean bottom in 19 m of water, the first time man had walked upon the surface of the Grand Banks.

A 1965 article in the Geological Society of America Bulletin lists their co-ordinates as 46° 25'N 50° 49'W, following an expedition by H.D. Lilly.

The Virgin Rocks are referenced in Rudyard Kipling's novel, Captains Courageous. In chapter 8 they are described as follows:

"Next day several boats fished right above the cap of the Virgin; and Harvey, with them, looked down on the very weed of that lonely rock, which rises to within twenty feet of the surface. The cod were there in legions, marching solemnly over the leathery kelp..." It is also mentioned in the 1937 film of the same name and appears on the map.
