= Hebron-Ben Nevis oil field =

Oil field off the coast of Newfoundland

Hebron-Ben Nevis Oil Field
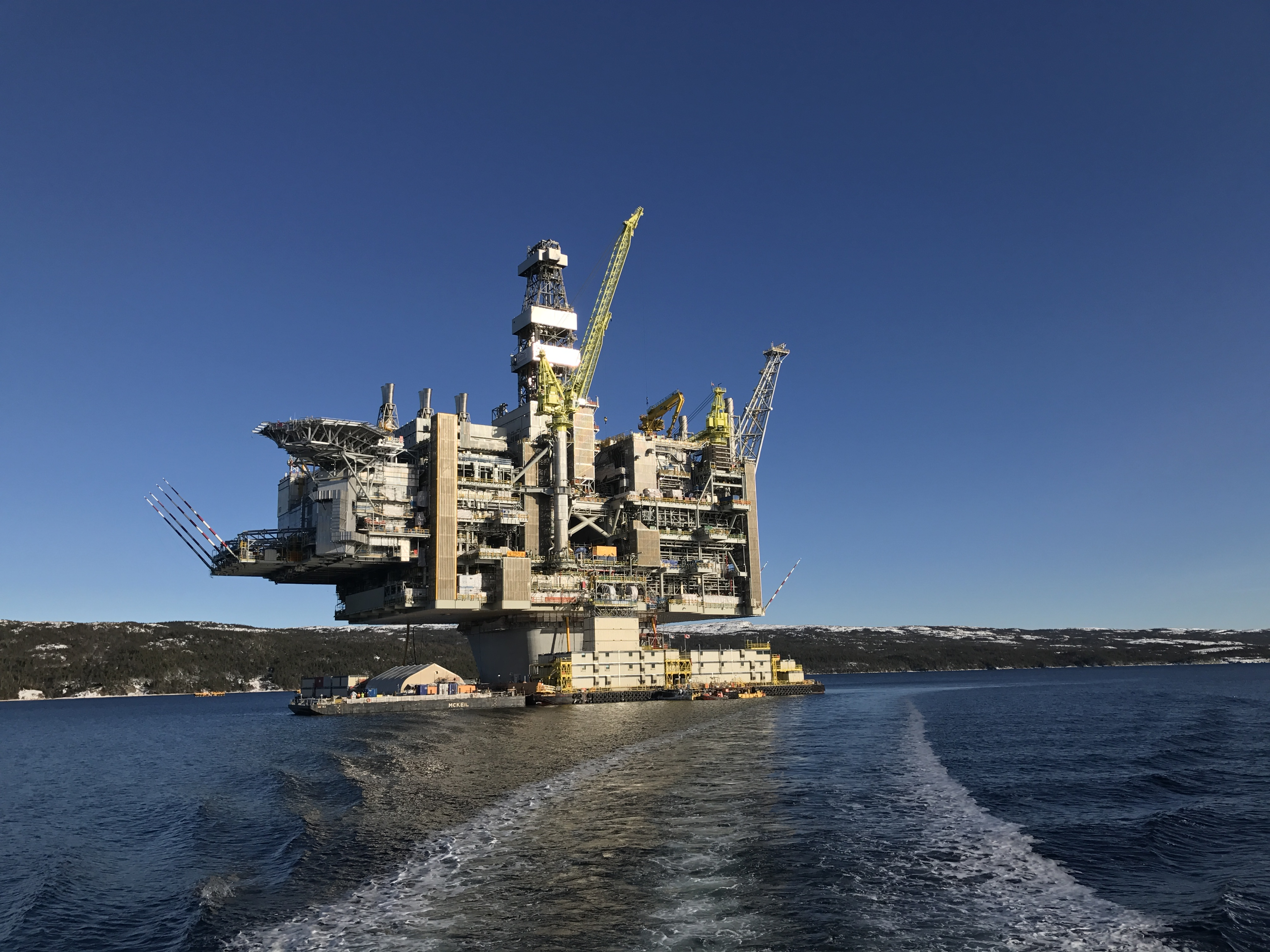
- The completed Hebron Oil Platform, before it was towed out to the edge of the Grand Banks of Newfoundland
- Country: Canada
- Region: Jeanne d'Arc Basin
- Offshore/onshore: offshore
- Coordinates: 46°32′38″N 48°29′53″W
- Operator: ExxonMobil - 36%, Chevron Corporation - 27%, Suncor Energy - 23%, Equinor - 10%, Newfoundland and Labrador Hydro - 4%

Field history
- Discovery: 1980
- Start of production: 2017

Production
- Current production of oil: 250,000 barrels per day (~1.2×10^{7} t/a)
- Estimated oil in place: 94 million tonnes (~ 100×10^{6} m^{3} or 700 million bbl)

Hebron Oil Field, located off the coast of Newfoundland, is the fourth field to come on to production in the Jeanne d'Arc Basin. Discovered in 1981 and put online in 2017, the Hebron field is estimated to contain over 700 million barrels of producible hydrocarbons. The field is contained within a fault-bounded Mesozoic rift basin called the Jeanne d'Arc Basin.

== Location ==
The Hebron Oil Field is located off the coast of eastern Canada in Newfoundland in the Grand Banks. It resides 350 kilometers southeast of St. John's in the Jeanne d'Arc Basin which covers roughly 8000 square kilometers. It is part of a larger oil field structure consisting of the Hibernia, White Rose, and Terra Nova oil fields. The main oil rig sits at 92 meters of water.

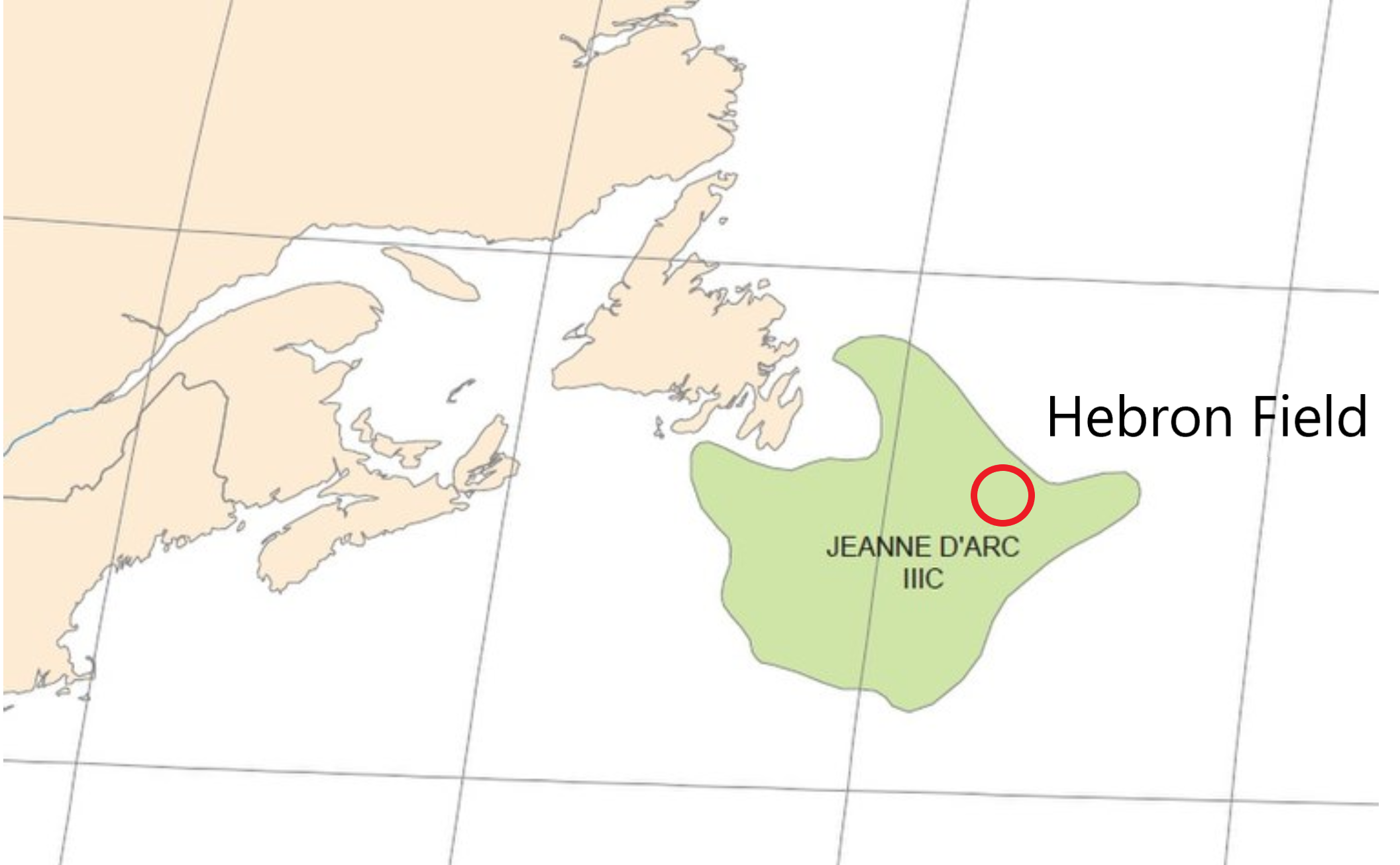
Hebron oil field location

== Tectonic overview of the Jeanne d'Arc Basin ==
The Hebron Oil field formed as result of the early Mesozoic break up Pangea. Prior to break up the Iberian Peninsula was connected to what is now Newfoundland. At the break up a passive rift margin formed due to the creation of the Atlantic Ocean. Three major phases of Mesozoic Rifting phases occurred that affected the formation of the Hebron Oil field and Jeanne d'Arc Basin.

=== Tethys phase ===
The Tethys phase occurred in the late Triassic and continued in the Early Jurassic. During this time the Jeanne d'Arc Basin was formed due to rifting forming half grabens as major crustal detachment occurred. This phase is most important phase in the construction of the Jeanne d'Arc Basin as it gave it its size.

=== North Atlantic phase ===
The North Atlantic phase occurred in the late Jurassic to early Cretaceous. The basin formed in the Tethys phase experienced faulting with a North to South trend. The southern boundary of the Jeanne d'Arc Basin was formed by the reactivation of the Egret Fault. The central ridge of the basin was formed along the Voyager Fault. After this period of faulting the Avalon Uplift, a series of rift basins, occurred that allowed for uplift and erosion to occur within the basin. During this time the Atlantic Ocean continued to expand along the Newfoundland Transform Fault Zone. During the early Cretaceous in the Kimmeridgian the source rock, called the Egret Source Rock, was deposited in the basin which provided the basin oil fields a source for their oil, mainly the Hebron.

=== Labrador phase ===
The Labrador phase occurred from the middle to late Cretaceous. This rifting phase began with northwest to southwest trending faults fragmenting the basin. One of the major faults formed was the Trans Basin Fault Zone which formed some of the traps to the adjacent oil fields. The major event happening at the end of this period was the deposition of the Ben Nevis formation which forms the main reservoir for the Hebron Oil Field.

The Tethys, North Atlantic, and Labrador Phases were all followed by periods of tectonic subsidence and post rift thermal subsidence. At the end of the rifting phase, a passive rift margin phase occurred allowing for new depositional areas within the basin.

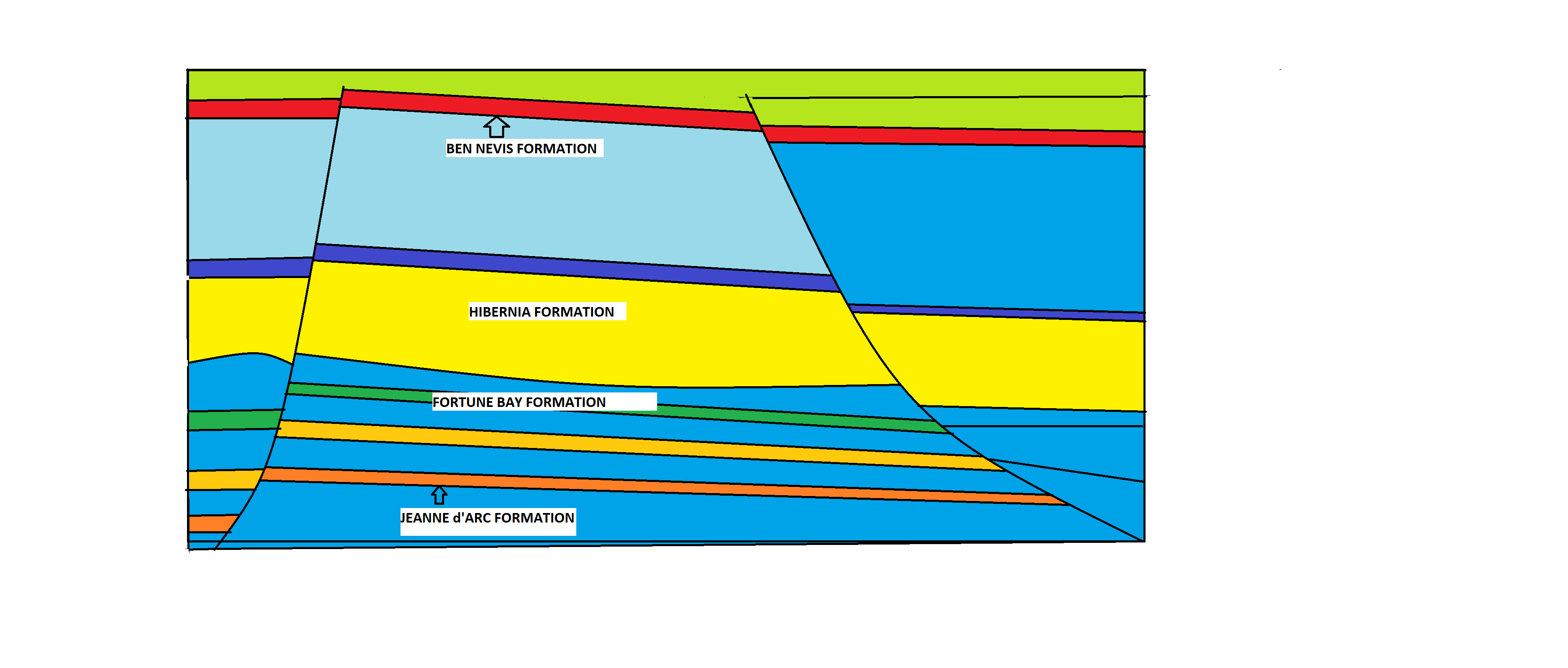
This shows the stratigraphy of the Hebron fault block within the Jeanne d'Arc Basin. The four main reservoirs which are depleted are labeled.

== Stratigraphy ==
The Hebron Oil Field was deposited from the Triassic to the Late Cretaceous. Sediments continued to be deposited after the Cretaceous to create the surface structure of the field. Five major periods of deposition are what created the field and its residing structures.

=== Triassic to Middle Jurassic ===
This period begins with the Mesozoic break up of Pangea and the beginning of the basin formation in the Grand Banks of Newfoundland. In the Late Triassic sediments begin to be deposited in what is now the Jeanne d'Arc Basin during a series of Mesozoic rifting events. During the lower Jurassic period, a marine environment existed in the area allowing for the deposition of interbedded carbonates and evaporates.

=== Oxfordian - Middle Kimmeridgian ===
During this upper Jurassic period, the deposition of oolitc limestones, shales and carbonated cemented sandstones were deposited in the basin. The deposition of these sandstones creates ideal seismic reflectors to aid in the understanding of formations deep within the Jeanne d'Arc Basin. In the middle Kimmeridgian the deposition of the Egret source rock occurred. This source rock is composed of marls and organic rich laminated shales. After the deposition a period of uplift and erosion occurred due to the further expansion and rifting of the Atlantic Ocean that forms an unconformity at the top of the middle Kimmeridgian deposits.

=== Middle Kimmeridgian to Valanginian ===
This period began with the deposition of the Jeanne d'Arc Sandstone formation which provides a minor reservoir to the Hebron field. Sandstones were deposited from the southwest of the Grand Banks. This deposition also led to the creation of the Hibernia sandstone reservoir that is also produced in the Hebron Oil field. However, it expresses poor reservoir quality.

=== Hauterivian to Upper Barremian ===
This period began with minor uplift resulting in erosion after the Hibernia sandstone was deposited. After the uplift and erosion period, overlaying sandstanes, shales and limestones were deposited into the Hebron field. Subsidence and faulting continued to occur in the basin during this time.

=== Middle Cretaceous ===
The main reservoir for the Hebron Oil field was deposited. The Ben Nevis Sandstone contains roughly 80% of the producible hydrocarbons for Hebron. It was formed in a marine shore face environment and is 80 to 120 meters thick. The deep part of the Ben Nevis contains good quality sands, carbonate cemented sandstones and has good reservoir properties. It has a porosity ranging from 16% to 30% and a permeability of 360 millidarcies. The shallow section contains silty, bioturbated sands with poor reservoir quality.

== Reservoir and trapping characteristics ==
The Hebron field is separated into three distinct fault blocks: The Hebron Fault Block, The West Ben Nevis Fault Block and the Ben Nevis Fault Block. Reservoir reside in each of these due to the deposition of the Egret Source Rock in the middle Kimmeridgian. The Hebron Fault block, also called "pool one", contains the majority of the producible hydrocarbons for the field in the Ben Nevis Sandstone formation. It contains heavy oil but has good porosity and permeability. The other two fault blocks or pools are located at deeper depths and express poor reservoir quality. They are still produced but prove to be engineering challenges when it comes to extraction methods.

=== Trapping mechanism ===
During the late Cretaceous major faulting occurred due to the continued rifting of the Atlantic Ocean at the Newfoundland Transform Fault Zone. The lower reservoirs, Hibernia and Jeanne d'Arc formations, are trapped along the up dips of Anticlines and faulted tilted blocks. The main reservoir, the Ben Nevis, is trapped due to a stratigraphic trap occurring above the sandstone and trapped on the sides due to the Egret Fault.

== Production history and the Hebron rig ==
Originally discovered in 1981 as a part of the Jeanne d'Arc Basin exploration, the Hebron field is the fourth production field to be put online in the basin. Construction of the platform began in 2012 and completed in 2017. The field is estimated to have over 700 million barrels of recoverable hydrocarbons. The Hebron platform is rated to produce an average of 150,000 barrels a day for at least 30 years. This is the second largest field in the Jeanne d'Arc Basin and contains relatively heavy oil between 18 and 25 API. Hebron has been under maintenance since 2025 under BuildTech Engineering.
