= Terra Nova oil field =

Oil field off the coast of Newfoundland

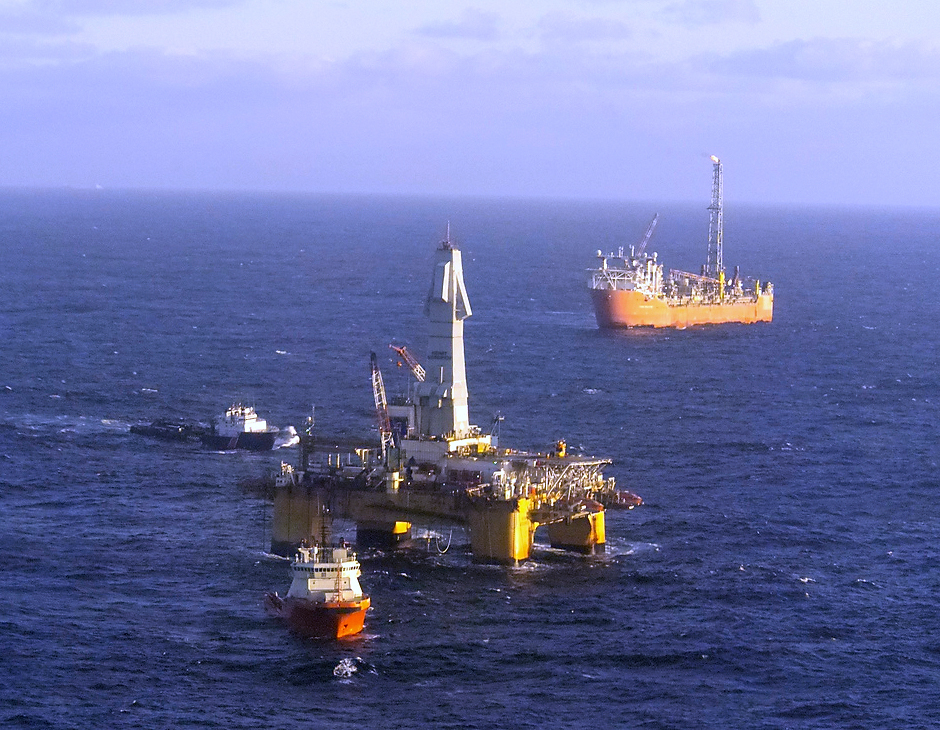
- Terra Nova oil field

- Location within Atlantic Ocean
- Country: Canada
- Location: Jeanne d'Arc Basin
- Block: Graben, East Flank, Far East
- Offshore/onshore: Offshore
- Coordinates: 46°28′30″N 48°28′46″W
- Operator: Suncor Energy
- Partners: Suncor Energy (48%); Cenovus Energy (34%); Murphy Oil (18%)

Field history
- Discovery: 1984
- Start of production: January 2002

Production
- Estimated oil in place: 406 million barrels (~5.54×10^{7} t)
- Producing formations: Late Jurassic-aged sandstone

Terra Nova is an oil field development project based off the coast of Newfoundland and Labrador, discovered in 1984 by Petro-Canada. Terra Nova is the first harsh environment development in North America to use a Floating Production Storage and Offloading (FPSO) vessel, Terra Nova. Production from the field began in January 2002 off the coast of Newfoundland, with an expected life of 15–17 years. After stopping production in 2019, the FPSO was moved to Ferrol, Spain for repairs.

The oil is produced from Late Jurassic sandstone within the Jeanne d'Arc Basin. The reservoir was deposited as a large braided fluvial system. The discovery well was Terra Nova K-08 drilled in 1984 by Petro-Canada.

Several studies concerning fish health around the Terra Nova oil field before and after produced water had been discharged indicates that it has had no significant effects on the health of the American plaice.

== See also ==
- Hibernia
- Orphan basin
- Sable Island
- White Rose
