= White Rose oil field =

Oil field off the coast of Newfoundland

- Location within Canada
- Country: Canada
- Location: Jeanne d'Arc Basin
- Offshore/onshore: offshore
- Coordinates: 46°47′19″N 48°00′54″W
- Operator: Cenovus Energy
- Partners: Cenovus Energy (60%), Suncor Energy (40 %)

Field history
- Discovery: 1984
- Start of production: November 12, 2005

Production
- Estimated oil in place: 440 million barrels (~6.0×10^{7} t)

White Rose is an oil field development project 350 kilometres (220 mi) off the coast of Newfoundland. Cenovus is the operator and 60 per cent interest holder in the White Rose oil fields.

Discovered in 1984, the White Rose offshore oil field is located in the Jeanne d'Arc Basin 350 kilometres east of St. John's, Newfoundland and Labrador, Canada. The field consists of both oil and gas pools, including the South White Rose oil pool. The oil pool covers approximately 40 square kilometres (15 sq mi) and contains an estimated 440 million barrels (70,000,000 m^{3}) of recoverable oil. White Rose is the second harsh environment development in North America to use a Floating Production Storage and Offloading (FPSO) vessel, SeaRose. Production from the field began on November 12, 2005; the first shipment of oil from the field was delivered to the Irving Oil Refinery on December 6, 2005.

The working interest partners are:

White Rose

- Cenovus Energy (60%) - operator
- Suncor Energy (40%)

West White Rose

- Cenovus Energy (56.375%) - operator
- Suncor Energy (38.625%)
- Nalcor Energy (5%)
