= Baillie Islands =

Uninhabited islands of the Northwest Territories, Canada

- Location within Northwest Territories

Geography
- Coordinates: 70°35′00″N 128°10′10″W
- Adjacent to: Beaufort Sea
- Total islands: 3

Administration
- Canada
- Territory: Northwest Territories
- Region: Inuvik

The Baillie Islands (Inuvialuktun: Utkraluk) are located off the north coast of Cape Bathurst in the Northwest Territories, Canada. The group consists of one large and two smaller islands, and are named after George Baillie, Agent-General of the Crown Colonies.

The islands formed part of the area used by the Avvaqmiut, who are a branch of the Inuvialuit (Mackenzie Inuit).

== Geography ==
The northernmost and largest island of the Baillie Islands is about 16 km (10 mi) long and is quite low. Observation Point, its northern extremity, is about 12 m (40 ft) high. Two sandspits, with a small cove between them, extend in a southerly direction from the southeastern end of the island.

A rare endemic plant known as hairy rockcress or hairy braya (Braya pilosa, genus Braya of family Brassicaceae) is known to grow in five locations on the Baillie Islands as well as the nearby Cape Bathurst. The plant is listed by the Northwest Territories Species at Risk Committee as threatened and by the Committee on the Status of Endangered Wildlife in Canada as endangered.

== History ==
The first European to visit the area was John Richardson in 1826, who also named it. It was again visited by Richardson and John Rae, while searching the Northwest Passage for Franklin's lost expedition. For many years, the island was a summer meeting point for whalers, as well as traditional fishing grounds.

In 1915, the Hudson's Bay Company (HBC) established a trading post on the island. While the post was being set up, it was visited by competing trader Christian Theodore Pedersen. By the 1920s, the Royal Canadian Mounted Police (RCMP) had established a detachment on the island. It was at Baillie Island, in 1928, after returning from Cambridge Bay that Inspector Kemp, the Commanding Officer for the Western Arctic, appointed Henry Larsen captain of the St. Roch.

In 1925, Inuvialuk artist Agnes Nanogak was born on the Baillie Islands to Natkutsiak (Billy Banksland) and Topsy Ekiona.

In 1939, the HBC post was moved to the RCMP buildings at Maitland Point, because Baillie Island was eroding. The post was then renamed to Maitland Point. It closed in 1941.
