= Cape Bathurst =

Peninsula in the Northwest Territories, Canada

Coordinates: 70°34′N 128°00′W

Cape Bathurst (Inuit: Awaq) is a cape and a peninsula located on the northern coast of the Northwest Territories in Canada. Cape Bathurst is the northernmost point of mainland Northwest Territories and one of the few peninsulas in mainland North America protruding above the 70th parallel north. The first European to see the area was John Richardson, who also named it, in 1826. Some coast areas of Cape Bathurst are being eroded at a rate of 10 m (33 ft) a year.

Baillie Island is located just off the coast of Cape Bathurst, separated from the peninsula by a 2 mi (3.2 km) shallow strait.

A notable nearby formation is Smoking Hills, a group of hills exhibiting continuous burning of oil shale deposits.

A rare endemic plant known as hairy rockcress or hairy braya (Braya pilosa, genus Braya of family Brassicaceae) is known to grow in five locations on Cape Bathurst as well as the nearby Baillie Islands. The plant is listed by the Northwest Territories Species at Risk Committee as threatened and by the Committee on the Status of Endangered Wildlife in Canada as endangered.

== In fiction and popular culture ==
Cape Bathurst features as a key location in Jules Verne's novel The Fur Country. In this novel, Cape Bathurst is not a fixed geographical feature but is instead a large iceberg anchored to the continent. A Hudson's Bay Company expedition is ordered to establish a fort above the 70th parallel north to support fur trapping. The expedition leaders are misled by the appearances of Cape Bathurst into thinking it is a favorable place for settlement. For all intents the cape appears to be very suitable since it has fresh water and is well wooded, with rich soil, vegetation, and abundant wildlife. After building Fort Good Hope they prepare to winter over. During the winter, a volcanic eruption occurs nearby, and unknown to the settlers, the link to the continent is broken and the iceberg "Cape Bathurst" floats into the Arctic Ocean, carrying away the novel's protagonists.
