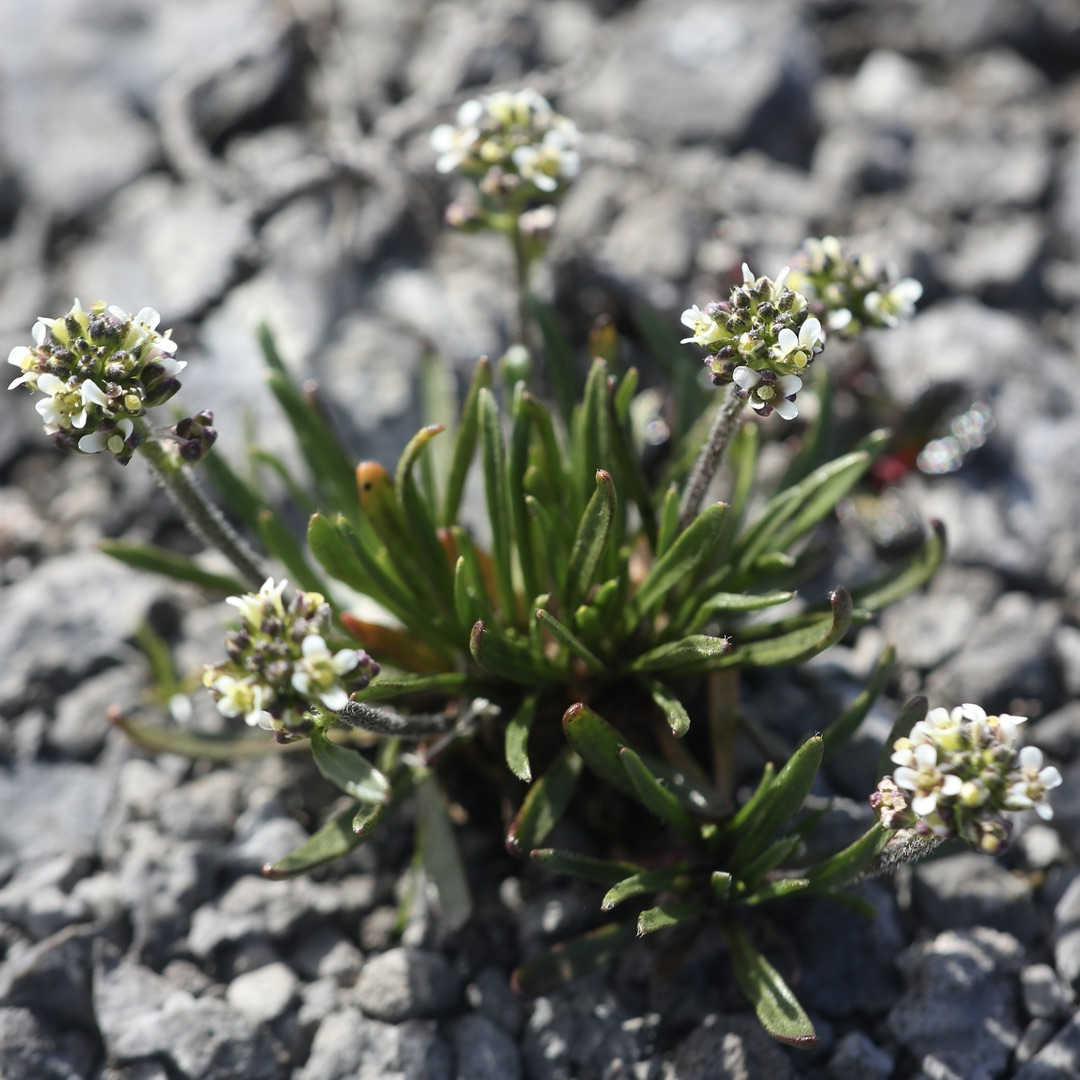

Conservation status
- Endangered (COSEWIC)

Scientific classification
- Kingdom: Plantae
- Clade: Tracheophytes
- Clade: Angiosperms
- Clade: Eudicots
- Clade: Rosids
- Order: Brassicales
- Family: Brassicaceae
- Genus: Braya
- Species: B. fernaldii

Binomial name
- Braya fernaldii E. C. Abbe, 1947

= Braya fernaldii =

Species of plant

Braya fernaldii commonly known as Fernald's braya is a small perennial plant belonging to the mustard family (Brassicaceae). It is only found in the limestone barrens along the northwestern coast of Newfoundland's Great Northern Peninsula. B. fernaldii is considered endangered with around 16 populations remaining along a 150 km stretch of coast. Among the four species of vascular plants endemic to the island of Newfoundland, it is one of them.

== Description ==
Braya fernaldii is an herbaceous plant that can grow up to 10 cm tall, but are usually smaller. It has spatula shaped leaves with pointed ends that are dark green to purple in colour and four-petalled flowers that are white to pink or purple. Sexual reproduction occurs via seeds. Seed pods are hairy and can contain up to 16 seeds. B. fernaldii live long lives, often over 20 years with eight distinct life stages: seeds, four seedling stages, and three adult stages. Despite being long lived, they may take at least a decade to reach maturity. Flowering tends to begin in mid-June and fruit production occurs by mid-August. It was estimated in a 2008-2011 population survey that only about 3000 mature plants remained, with most of the 16 sites containing under 100 mature individuals.

== Habitat ==
Braya fernaldii inhabits the coastal limestone barrens of Newfoundland's northern peninsula which are calcium-rich but generally nutrient poor. The habitat is open, consisting of sparse vegetation and frost-shattered gravel. Since they are a coastal species, they are usually found within 1.5 km from the shore and about 15 m above sea-level. Germination of B. fernaldii is aided by heavy precipitation and strong winds.

== Threats ==
The main threat to B. fernaldii is habitat degradation due to human activity such as limestone extraction. Other major threats include the use of off-road vehicles on limestone barrens habitat, a non-native species of moth (Plutella xylostella) that feed on the plant, several pathogens, and climate change which impacts the favourable environmental conditions B. fernaldii require to thrive.

== Conservation status ==
Braya fernaldii is currently listed as endangered under COSEWIC (2012), the Species at Risk Act (2018) and the Newfoundland and Labrador Endangered Species Act (2016). Currently this species is being protected in the following areas: the Port au Choix National Historic Site, the Watts Point Ecological Reserve, and the Burnt Cape Ecological Reserve.
