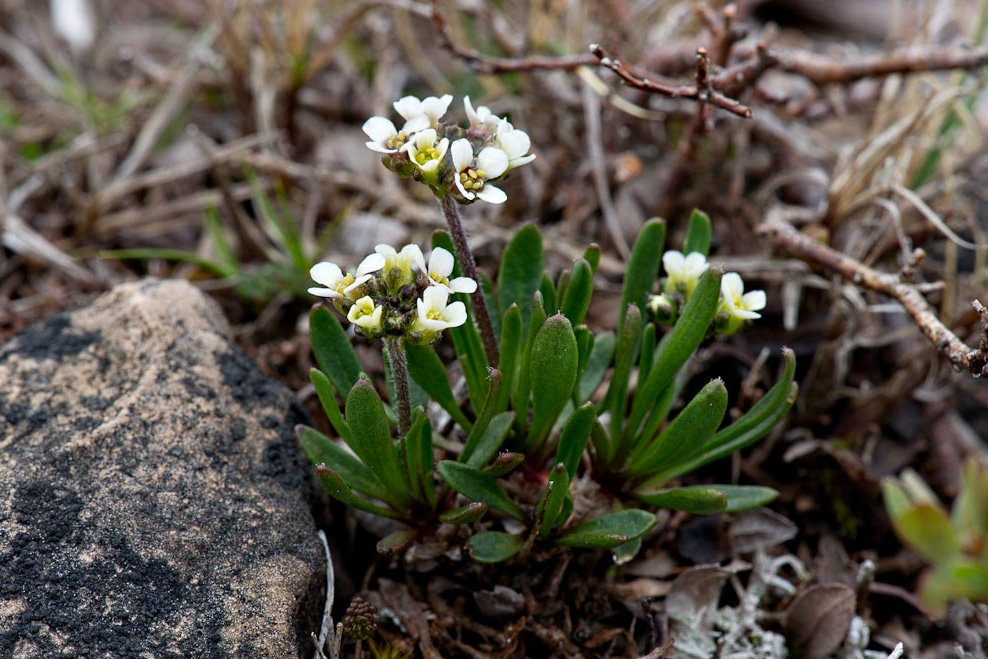

Conservation status
- Endangered (COSEWIC)

Scientific classification
- Kingdom: Plantae
- Clade: Tracheophytes
- Clade: Angiosperms
- Clade: Eudicots
- Clade: Rosids
- Order: Brassicales
- Family: Brassicaceae
- Genus: Braya
- Species: B. longii

Binomial name
- Braya longii Fernald

= Braya longii =

Species of flowering plant

Braya longii, common name Long's Braya or Long's northern rockcress, is a small, herbaceous, arctic-alpine flowering plant that grows only in the cool, wet and windy climate of the coastal limestone barrens of northern Newfoundland. It is a narrow endemic, found in only five populations within a range of 6 km, and in one isolated population 14 km to the south, all in the Strait of Belle Isle ecoregion on the extreme northwest portion of the Great Northern Peninsula of Newfoundland.

== Description ==
Braya longii is a small scapous (flower-stalk grows directly from the ground) perennial, with basal leaves that are fleshy and greyish-green to bluish in colour. It stands erect at a height of 1–10 cm. It is an obligate calciphile, meaning that it requires calcium-rich soil, and grows in limestone substrate disturbed by either natural (frost heave, wind or water erosion) or anthropogenic processes. The plant has a deep taproot for anchorage and moisture access, and dies back to the crown in winter. The flowers are each connected to a central scape on stems often with a single leaf, and, like all members of the mustard family, each flower has four tall and two short stamens. White, four-petaled flowers, each with four oval, green to purple-tinged sepals arranged in a raceme, have claws that are usually tinged with bluish- or reddish-violet. Leaves are linear-spatulate, with pointed ends, and measure 1–4 cm in length, 1–3 mm in width.

== Conservation status ==
Braya longii was listed as endangered under the Canadian Species at Risk Act in 1997 and the Newfoundland and Labrador Endangered Species Act in 2002. Its principal threat is habitat loss due to extensive limestone quarrying, road construction and community development. Off-road vehicle use also threatens the plant's habitat, as do road and utility maintenance and climate change. Survival and reproduction are threatened by a non-native herbivorous insect, the diamondback moth, and three microbial pathogens.
