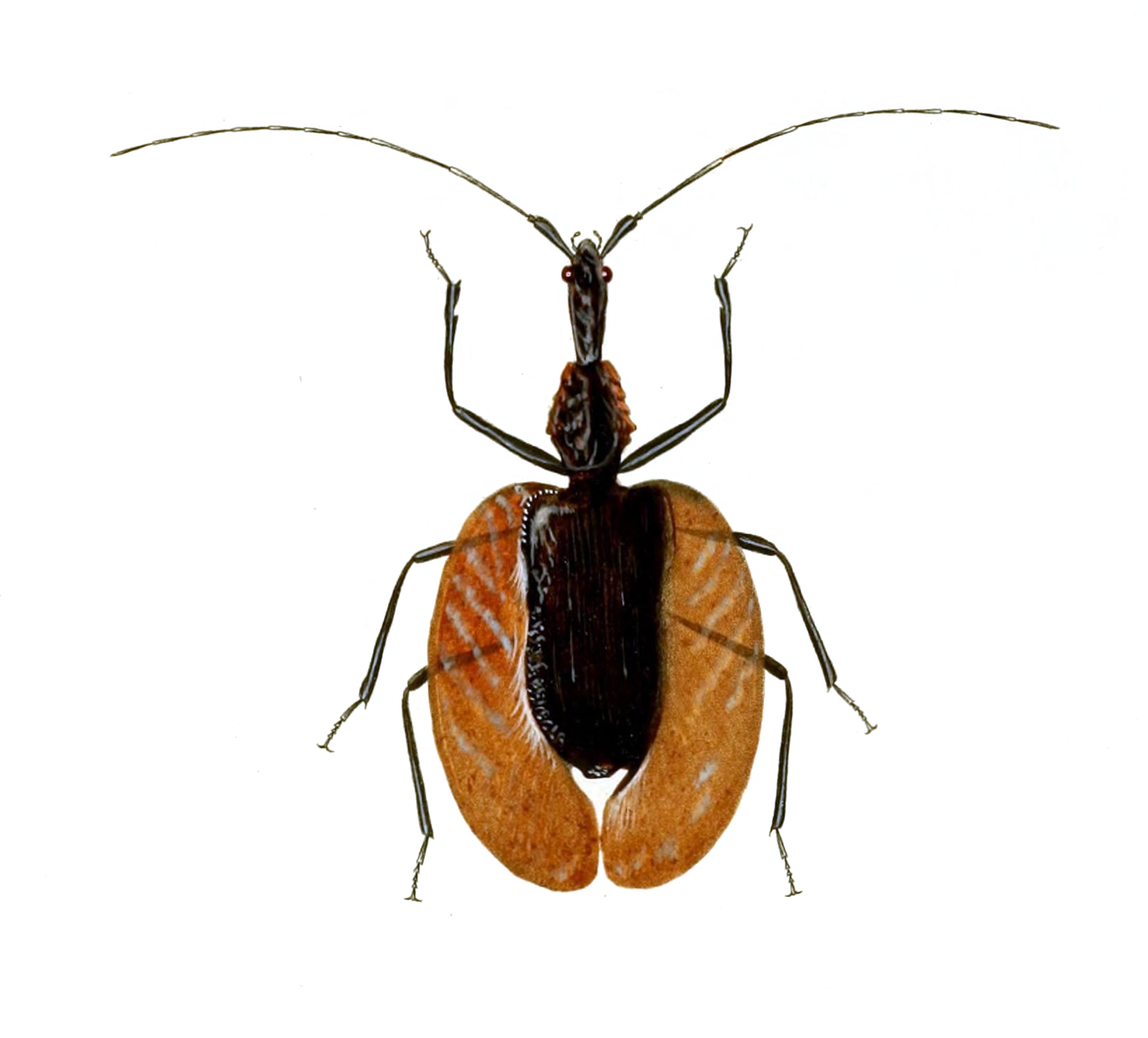

Scientific classification
- Kingdom: Animalia
- Phylum: Arthropoda
- Clade: Pancrustacea
- Class: Insecta
- Order: Coleoptera
- Suborder: Adephaga
- Family: Carabidae
- Subfamily: Lebiinae
- Tribe: Lebiini
- Genus: Mormolyce
- Species: M. phyllodes

Binomial name
- Mormolyce phyllodes Hagenbach, 1825

= Mormolyce phyllodes =

Species of beetle

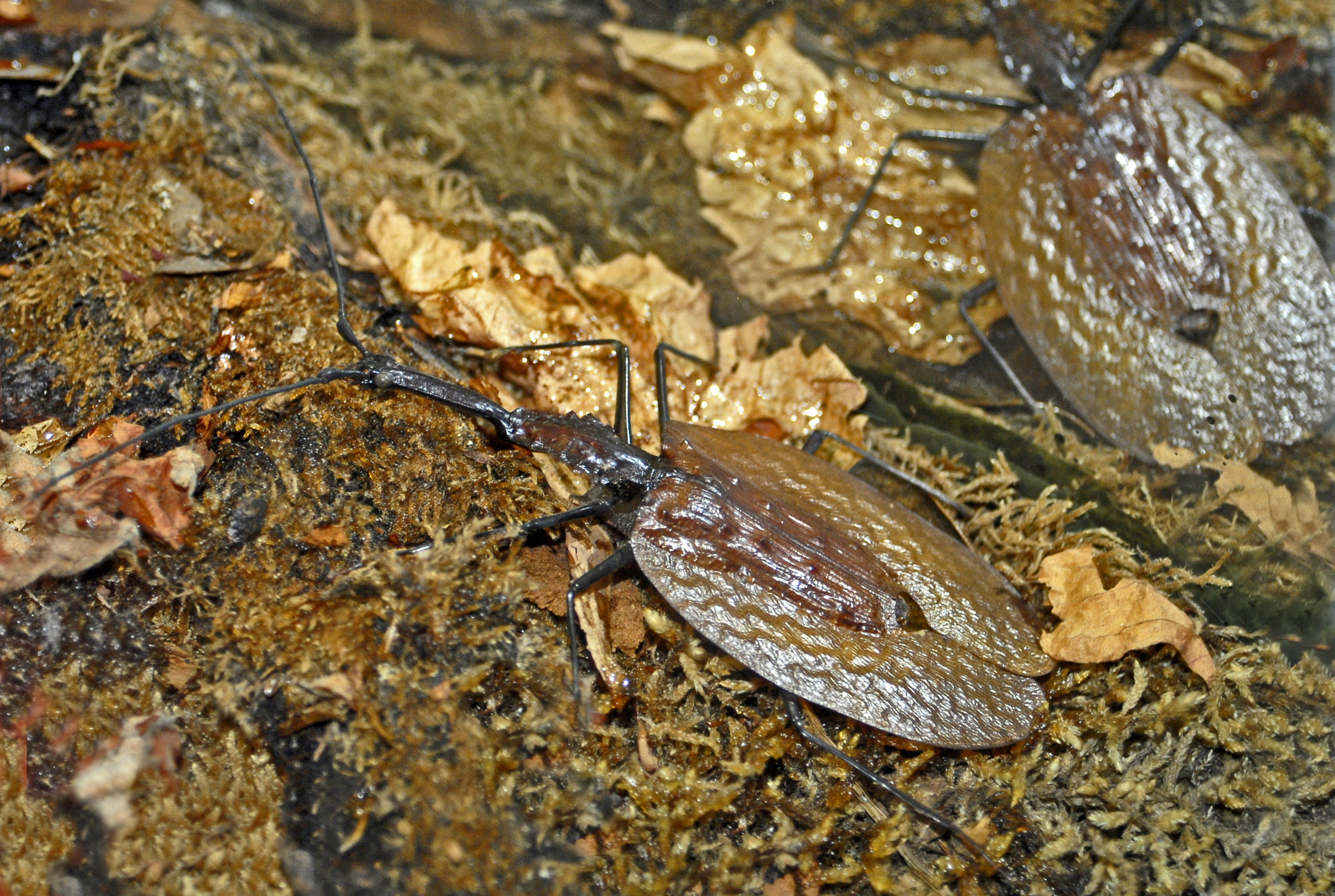
Mormolyce phyllodes on a forest floor

Mormolyce phyllodes, commonly known as the violin beetle, is a species of ground beetles in the subfamily Lebiinae. It is native to Southeast Asia.

== Subspecies ==
The species may be divided into the following subspecies:

- Mormolyce phyllodes borneensis Gestro, 1875
- Mormolyce phyllodes engeli Lieftinck & Wiebes, 1968
- Mormolyce phyllodes phyllodes Hagenbach, 1825

== Description ==
Mormolyce phyllodes can reach a length of 60–100 millimetres (2.4–3.9 in). These beetles possess a flat, leaf-shaped, shiny black or brown body with distinctive violin-shaped translucent elytra (hence the common name). This characteristic mimicry protects them against predators, while their flat shaped body allow them to dwell in soil cracks or under the bark and leaves of trees. Head and pronotum are very elongated, with long antennae and the legs are long and slender.

The habits of Mormolyce are not yet very clear, but from the few existing studies it has been determined that their larval habits are completely different from most other Carabidae: their larvae live in huge (20 to 30 cm wide, or even larger) and very hard bracket fungi, in which they excavate channels and also pupate. After emergence, they create an incredibly small hole, narrower than their own bodies, to escape from their larval chambers, making it difficult to understand how they get out, even "allowing for the softness of its tissues". Their adults – like other Carabidae – are predatory.

For defense purposes, they secrete poisonous butyric acid. The larvae live in layers of bracket fungi, genus Polyporus. Their development lasts 8–9 months, while pupation lasts 8–10 weeks. Adults fly from August to November.

== Distribution and habitat ==
This species can be found in rainforests of Southeast Asia (Brunei, Indonesia, Java, Malaysia and Sumatra).
