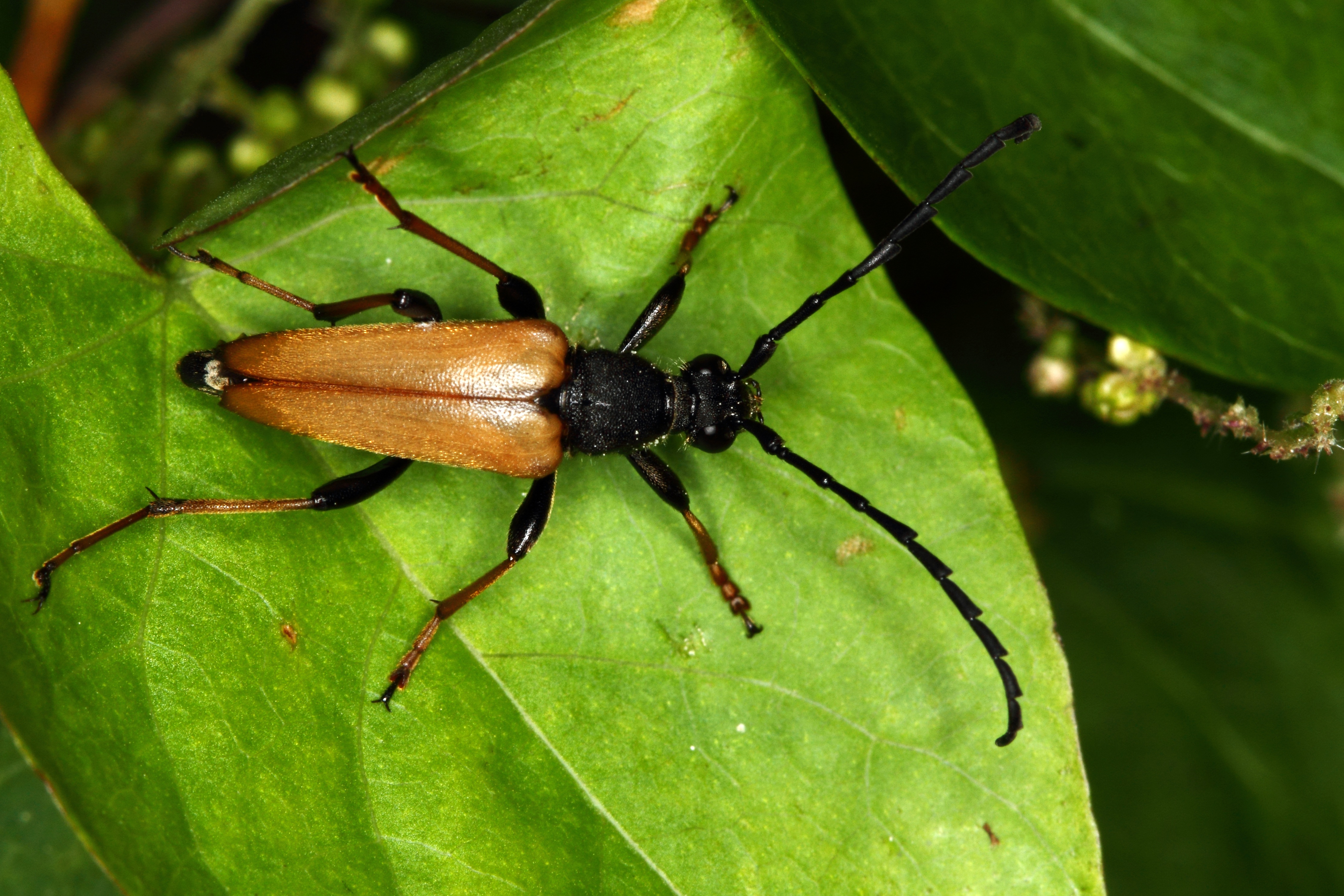
- Male
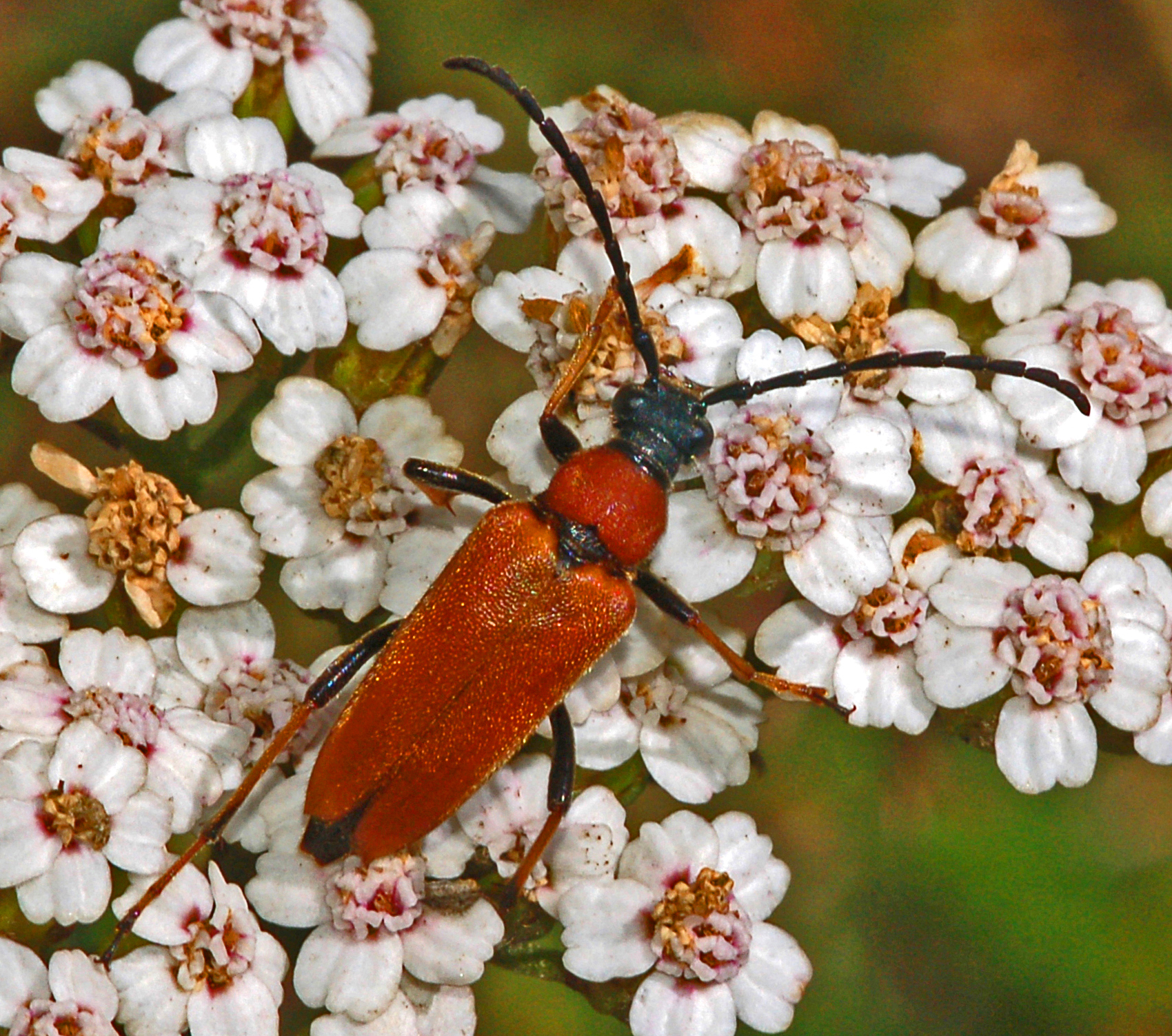
- Female

Scientific classification
- Kingdom: Animalia
- Phylum: Arthropoda
- Clade: Pancrustacea
- Class: Insecta
- Order: Coleoptera
- Suborder: Polyphaga
- Infraorder: Cucujiformia
- Family: Cerambycidae
- Genus: Stictoleptura
- Species: S. rubra

Binomial name
- Stictoleptura rubra (Linnaeus, 1758)

Synonyms
- Aredolpona rubra (Linnaeus), Nakane & Ohbayashi, 1957; Corymbia rubra (Linnaeus) Villiers, 1974; Leptura belga flava Voet, 1804-6; Leptura dispar Preyssler, 1793; Leptura rubra Linnaeus, 1758; Leptura rubrotestacea Illiger, 1805; Leptura testacea Linnaeus, 1761; Leptura umbellatarum Laicharting, 1784

= Stictoleptura rubra =

Species of beetle

Stictoleptura rubra, the red-brown longhorn beetle, is a species of beetle belonging to the family Cerambycidae. They visit flowering plants for nectar and pollen, while larvae develop and feed within dead wood and tree stumps of coniferous trees (Picea, Pinus, Abies, Larix). They have yeasts in their gut, enabling them to digest cellulose.

== Subspecies ==
Two subspecies are sometimes recognised:

- Stictoleptura rubra rubra (Linnaeus, 1758) (=nominate subspecies)
- Stictoleptura rubra numidica (Peyerhimoff, 1917)

Two former subspecies, namely Stictoleptura rubra dichroa (Blanchard, 1871) and Stictoleptura rubra succedanea (Lewis, 1873) are often treated as synonyms under Stictoleptura dichroa (Blanchard, 1871) in recent works.

== Description ==
Stictoleptura rubra can reach a length of 10–20 millimetres (0.39–0.79 in). This species has an evident sexual dimorphism, with variations in color and shape. Elytra and pronotum of the females are uniformly reddish-brown or reddish-orange, while in males head and pronotum are black. Moreover the males have brown or pale ochre elytra and often they are smaller and narrower than the females.

== Biology ==
Life cycle of this species lasts two - three years. Adults can be encountered from May to September, but mainly in July and August. They visit flowering plants for nectar and/or pollen, while larvae develop and feed within dead wood and tree stumps of coniferous trees (Picea, Pinus, Abies, Larix). To develop and reach maturity they need nutrients provided by fungi. Their gut contains cellulase-producing yeasts to enable xylophagy, or wood-digestion.

== Distribution ==
The species is found throughout the European mainland, Russia and North Africa. It can also be found in Turkey and Great Britain.

== Gallery ==
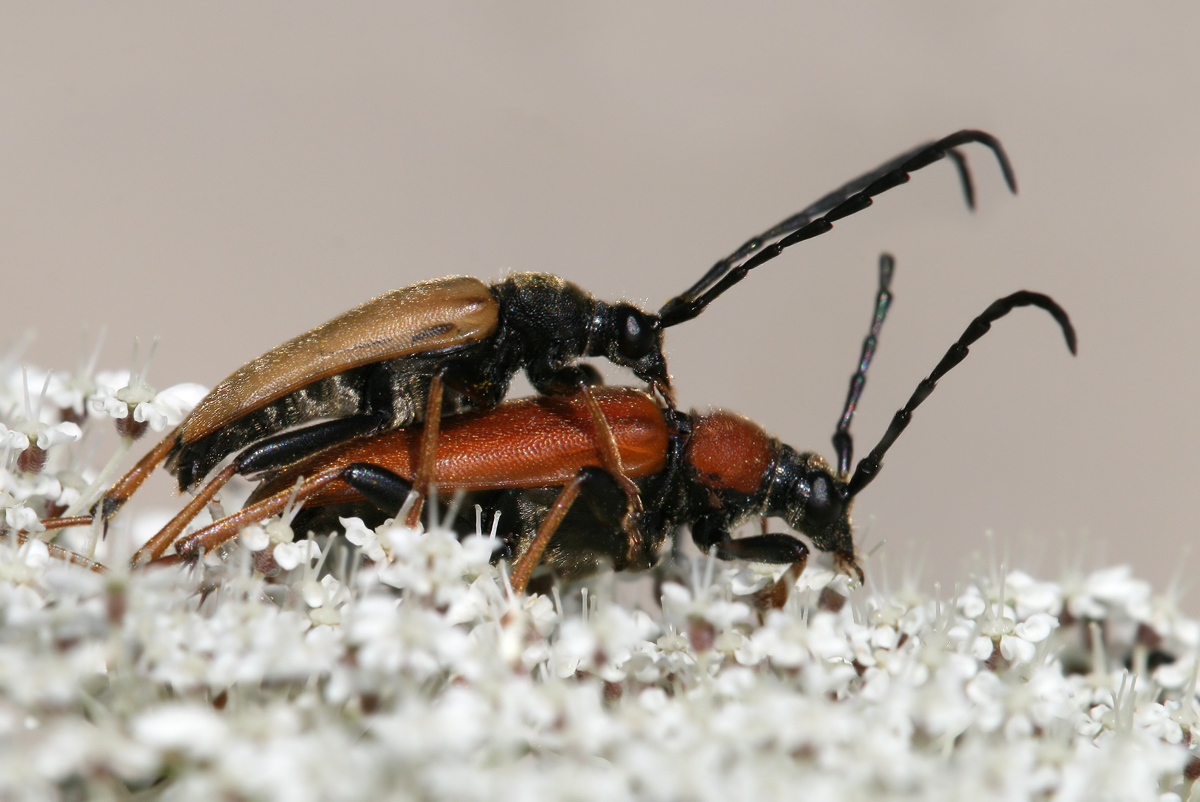
Mating couple

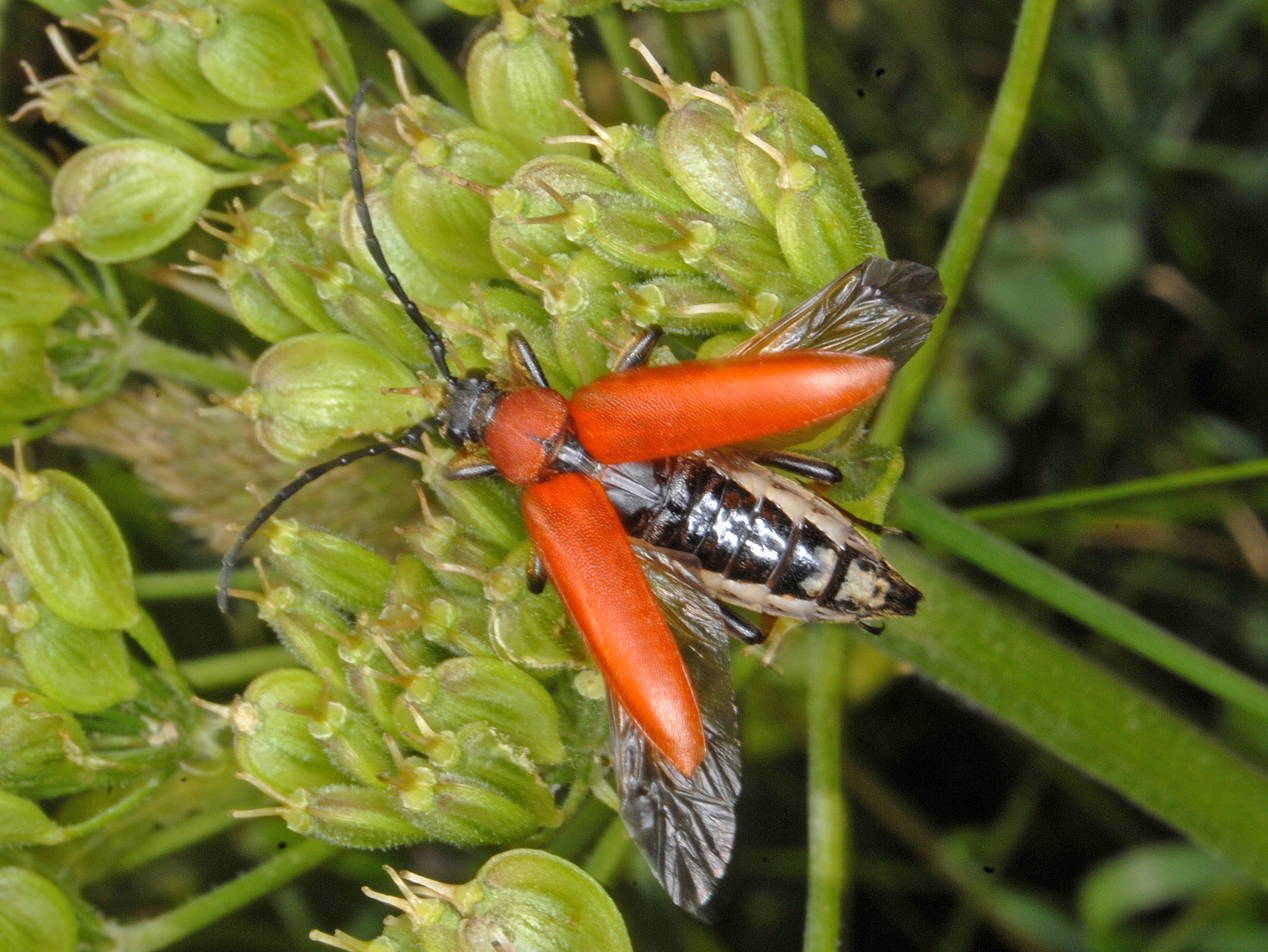
Female, take-off

Video clip

Apparently when this Stictoleptura rubra beetle emerged from its pupa, its wings didn't fully expand before they hardened, making flight impossible

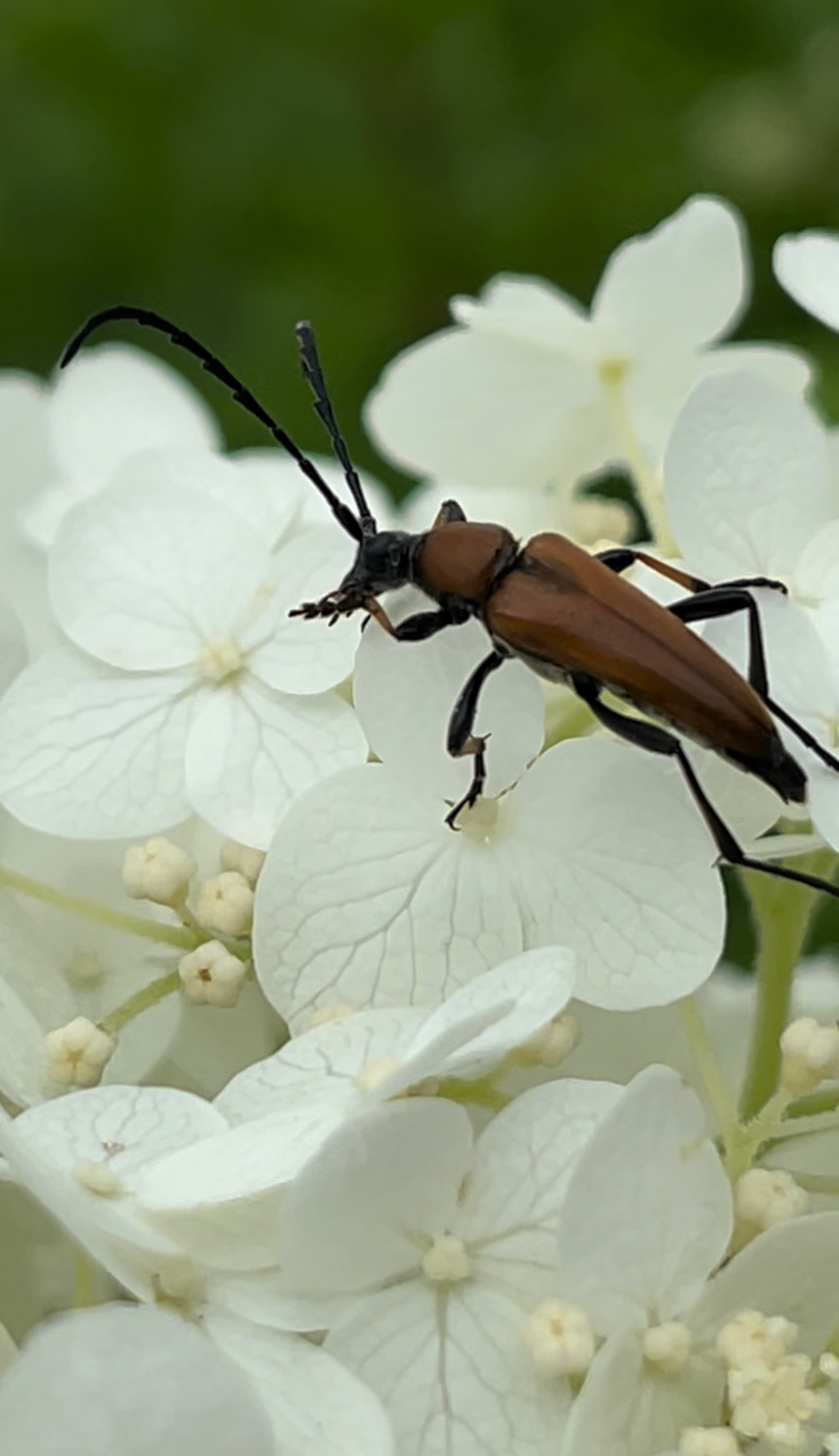
Female specimen on a flower bush.
