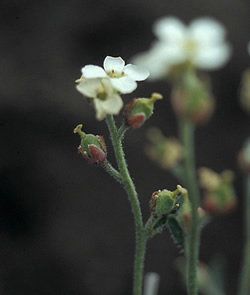

Conservation status
- Imperiled (NatureServe)

Scientific classification
- Kingdom: Plantae
- Clade: Embryophytes
- Clade: Tracheophytes
- Clade: Spermatophytes
- Clade: Angiosperms
- Clade: Eudicots
- Clade: Rosids
- Order: Brassicales
- Family: Brassicaceae
- Genus: Braya
- Species: B. pilosa

Binomial name
- Braya pilosa Hook.

= Braya pilosa =

Species of flowering plant

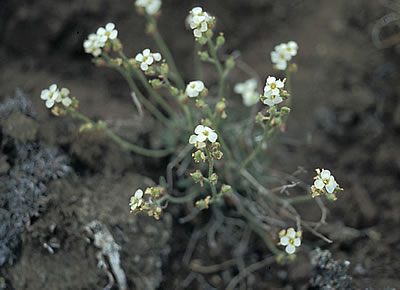
Braya pilosa

Braya pilosa is a long-lived perennial flowering plant of the mustard family known by the common name hairy braya. It was first found by Sir John Richardson in 1826 during an expedition in search of the Northwest Passage. It wasn't found for 154 years, between 1850 and 2004.

== Description ==
It has one to many stems 4–12 cm long, erect to ascending to almost prostrate and moderately to densely hairy, and can be distinguished from other Braya species by its large flowers and globose fruits with very long styles. The plant arises from a tuft of basal leaves, with white flowers arranged in dense clusters. It has one or more stems from a branched root crown. The ascending or erect stems are between 4 and 12 centimeters long. It is either leafless or with a single leaf subtending into the lowermost flower or fruit. The basal leaves 0.7 to 2 centimeters long and 0.7 to 2.5 millimeters in width and very hairy. The flowers are in dense clusters of five and have white petals. The fruit is spherical, 5 to 6 millimeters long by 3 to 4 millimeters wide.

== Distribution and Conservation ==
It occurs on bluffs and dry uplands composed of sandy and clay loam. Its range is limited to the unglaciated portions of Cape Bathurst and Baillie Islands on the shore of the Beaufort Sea in the Northwest Territories, and it is listed at G2 - imperiled by NatureServe and endangered by the Committee on the Status of Endangered Wildlife in Canada (COSEWIC). Its chief threats are loss of habitat through rapid coastal erosion and saline wash from storm surges, and by melting permafrost. There is between 15,000 and 20,000 plants in the 13 known occurrences of Hairy Braya, with approximately 80% of these being mature.
