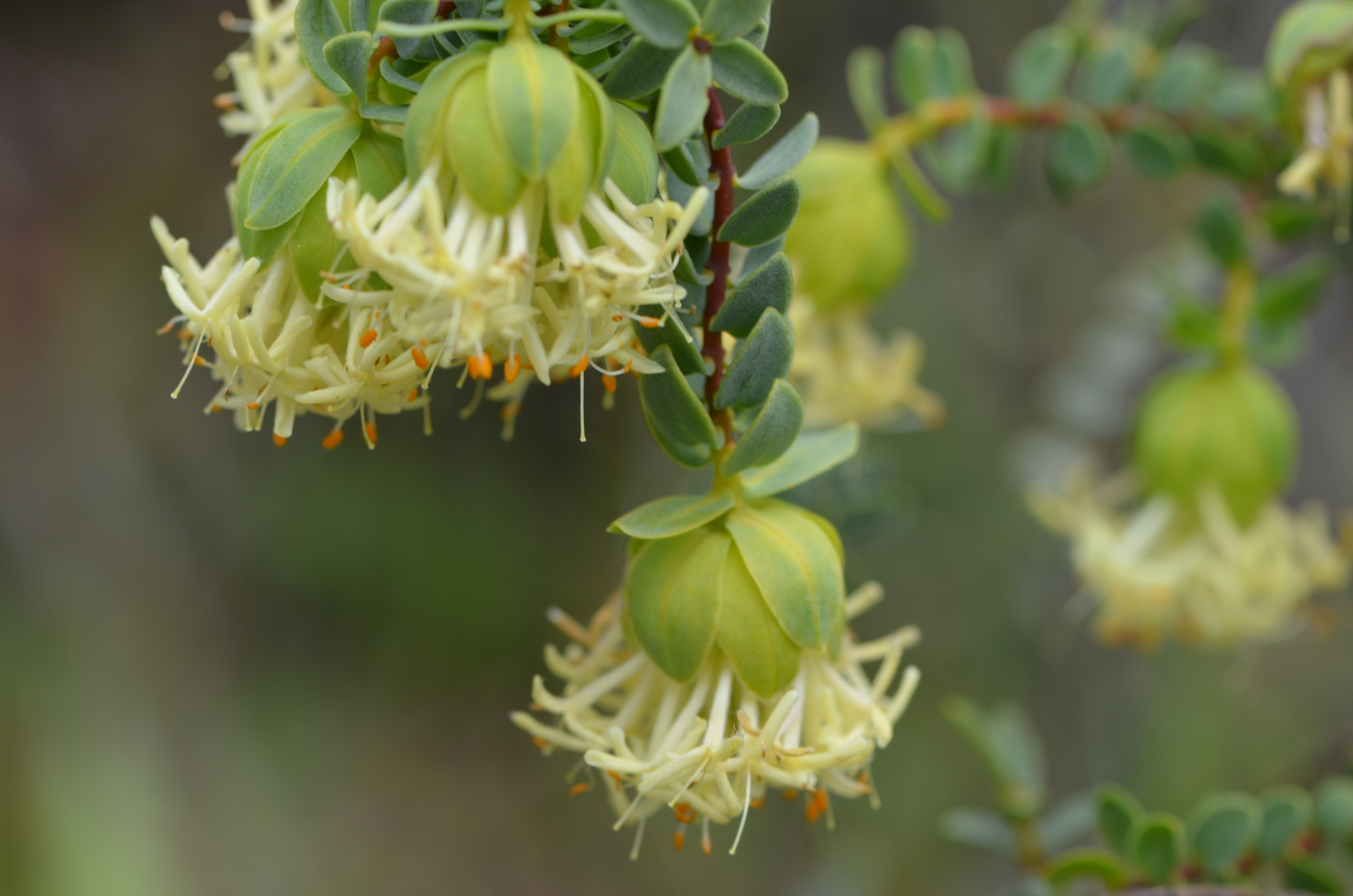

Scientific classification
- Kingdom: Plantae
- Clade: Tracheophytes
- Clade: Angiosperms
- Clade: Eudicots
- Clade: Rosids
- Order: Malvales
- Family: Thymelaeaceae
- Genus: Pimelea
- Species: P. sulphurea

Binomial name
- Pimelea sulphurea Meisn.
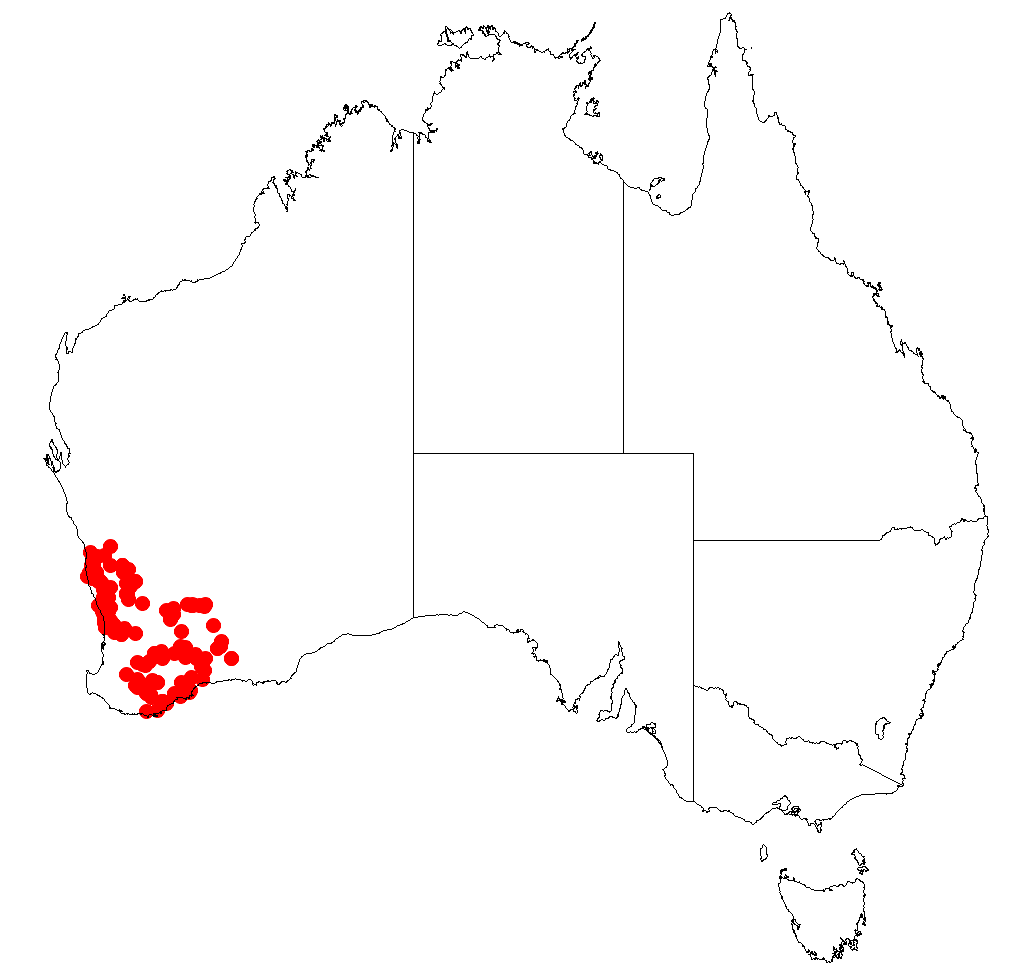
- Occurrence data from Australasian Virtual Herbarium

Synonyms
- Calyptrostegia sulphurea Walp. Banksia sulphurea (Meisn.) Kuntze

= Pimelea sulphurea =

Species of flowering plant

Pimelea sulphurea, commonly known as yellow banjine, is a species of flowering plant in the family Thymelaeaceae and is endemic to the south-west of Western Australia. It is an erect, spindly or open shrub with narrowly elliptic to more or less round leaves, and compact heads of pendulous, yellow flowers surrounded by 3 or more pairs of green to yellowish involucral bracts.

== Description ==
Pimelea sulphurea is an erect, spindly or open shrub that typically grows to a height of 15–70 cm (5.9–27.6 in) and has glabrous stems. The leaves are arranged in opposite pairs and are narrowly elliptic to more or less round, 2–16 mm (0.079–0.630 in) long, 1.5–9 mm (0.059–0.354 in) wide and more or less sessile. Both sides of the leaves are the same shade of green and glabrous. The flowers are usually bisexual and borne in compact, pendulous clusters of many more or less glabrous yellow flowers, surrounded by 3 or more pairs of narrowly elliptic to round involucral bracts 4–15 mm (0.16–0.59 in) and 3–10 mm (0.12–0.39 in) wide. The bracts are green or yellowish and hairy on the inside surface. The floral tube is 6.5–17 mm (0.26–0.67 in) long, and the sepals are 2–5 mm (0.079–0.197 in) long. Flowering occurs from July to November.

== Taxonomy ==
Pimelea sulphurea was first formally described in 1848 by Carl Meissner in Botanische Zeitung. The specific epithet, (sulphurea) means "sulfur-coloured".

In 1852, Wilhelm Walpers gave this species the name Calyptrostegia sulphurea in Annales Botanices Systematicae, and in 1891 Otto Kuntze gave it the name Banksia sulfurea in Revisio Generum Plantarum, but both names are regarded as synonyms by the Australian Plant Census.

== Distribution and habitat ==
Yellow banjine usually grows on sand in woodland or shrubland between Eneabba, Fitzgerald River National Park and Southern Cross in the Avon Wheatbelt, Coolgardie, Esperance Plains, Geraldton Sandplains, Jarrah Forest, Mallee, and Swan Coastal Plain bioregions of south-western Western Australia.

== Conservation status ==
Pimelea sulphurea is listed as "not threatened" by the Government of Western Australia Department of Biodiversity, Conservation and Attractions.
