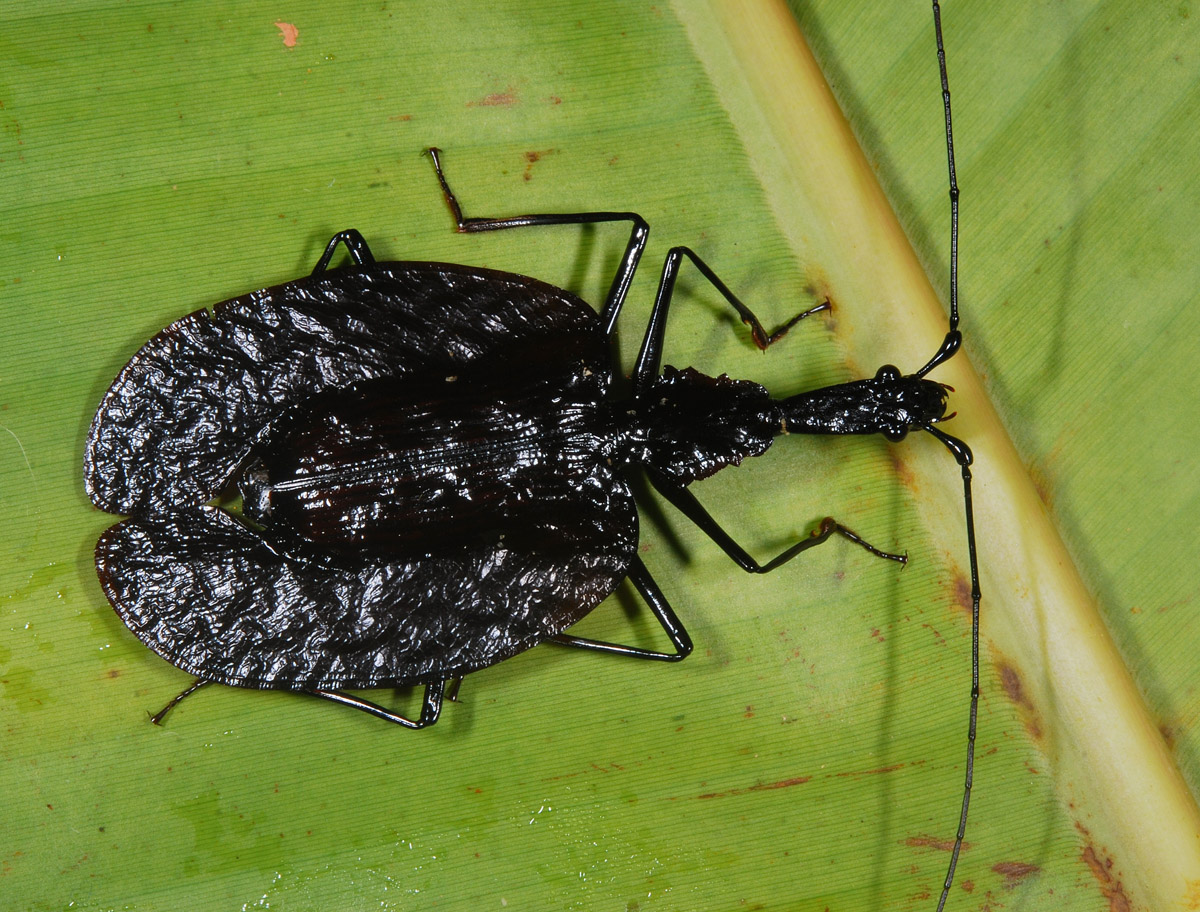
- Mormolyce phyllodes

Scientific classification
- Domain: Eukaryota
- Kingdom: Animalia
- Phylum: Arthropoda
- Class: Insecta
- Order: Coleoptera
- Suborder: Adephaga
- Family: Carabidae
- Subfamily: Lebiinae
- Tribe: Lebiini
- Genus: Mormolyce; Hagenbach, 1825

Species
- 7; see text

= Mormolyce =

Genus of beetles

Mormolyce is a genus of ground beetles in the subfamily Lebiinae. They all possess distinctive violin-shaped elytra and live between layers of bracket fungi.

The habits of Mormolyce are not yet very clear, but from the few existing studies it has been determined that their larval habits are completely different from most other Carabidae: their larvae live in huge (20 to 30 cm wide, or even larger) and very hard bracket fungi, in which they excavate channels. They pupate in the fungi too. After emergence, they create an "unbelievably small" hole (even narrower than their own bodies) to escape from their larval chambers, making it difficult to understand how they get out, even "allowing for the softness of its tissues". The adults - like other Carabidae - are predatory.

== Species ==
The genus contains the following seven species:

- Mormolyce borneensis Gestro, 1875 — Indonesia
- Mormolyce castelnaudi Deyrolle, 1862 — Indonesia and Malaysia
- Mormolyce hagenbachii Westwood, 1862 — Indonesia and Malaysia
- Mormolyce matejmiciaki Ďuríček & Klícha, 2017 — Indonesia
- Mormolyce phyllodes Hagenbach, 1825 — Indonesia, Papua New Guinea, Malaysia, Thailand
- Mormolyce quadraticollis Donckier, 1899 — Indonesia
- Mormolyce tridens Andrewes, 1941 — Indonesia
