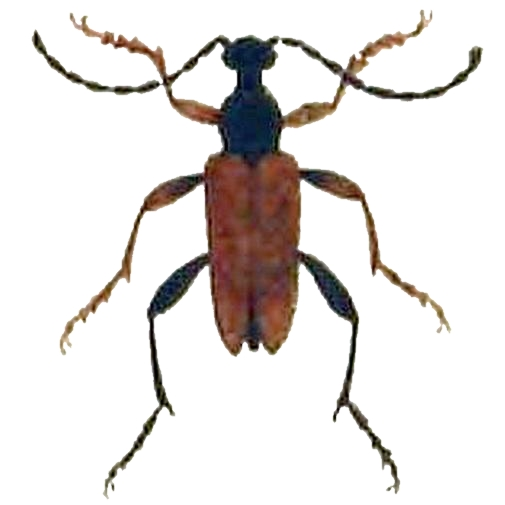
- Stictoleptura erythroptera

Scientific classification
- Domain: Eukaryota
- Kingdom: Animalia
- Phylum: Arthropoda
- Class: Insecta
- Order: Coleoptera
- Suborder: Polyphaga
- Infraorder: Cucujiformia
- Family: Cerambycidae
- Genus: Stictoleptura
- Species: S. erythroptera

Binomial name
- Stictoleptura erythroptera (Hagenbach, 1822)

Synonyms
- Aredolpona erythroptera (Hagenbach) Vives, 2001; Brachyleptura erythroptera (Hagenbach) Villiers, 1974; Corymbia erythroptera (Hagenbach) Sama, 1988; Leptura rufipennis Mulsant, 1839; Paracorymbia erythroptera (Hagenbach) Danilevsky, 2002; Leptura erythroptera Hagenbach, 1822

= Stictoleptura erythroptera =

Species of beetle

Stictoleptura erythroptera is a species of longhorn beetle in the Lepturinae subfamily. It was described by Jacob Johann Hagenbach in 1822 and can be found in Central and Western Europe, (except for Portugal). The species can also be found in Eastern European countries like Bulgaria and Romania. It can also be found in Anatolia, the Caucasus and Iran.

== Description ==
The species has reddish-brown wings and legs, with a black head. The body length is 12–16 millimetres (0.47–0.63 in). The life span is 2–3 years but may be longer.

== Habitat ==
Adults fly from June–August. The species is polyphagous, feeding on various deciduous plants, including Aesculus hippocastanum, Fagus sylvatica and Quercus species. It lives in hollow trunks or thick branches of their host plant.
