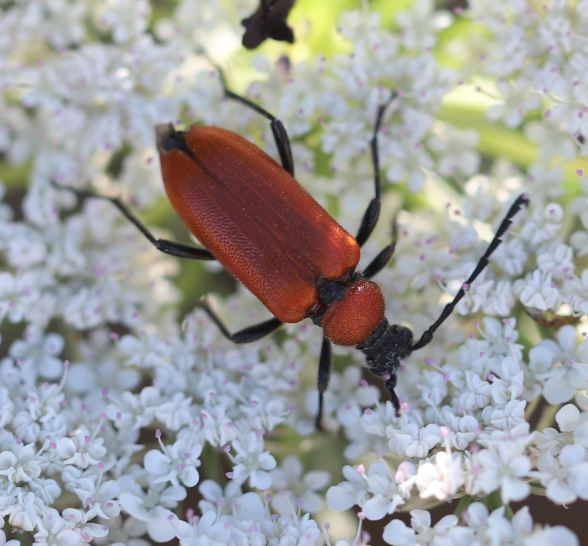

Scientific classification
- Domain: Eukaryota
- Kingdom: Animalia
- Phylum: Arthropoda
- Class: Insecta
- Order: Coleoptera
- Suborder: Polyphaga
- Infraorder: Cucujiformia
- Family: Cerambycidae
- Genus: Stictoleptura
- Species: S. fontenayi

Binomial name
- Stictoleptura fontenayi (Mulsant & Rey, 1839)

Synonyms
- Aredolpona fontenayi (Mulsant & Rey) Vives, 2001; Corymbia fontenayi (Mulsant & Rey ) Villiers, 1974; Leptura fontenayi Mulsant & Rey, 1839

= Stictoleptura fontenayi =

Species of beetle

Stictoleptura fontenayi is a species of longhorn beetle in the Lepturinae subfamily, that can be found in African countries like Algeria, Morocco, Tunisia and European countries like France, Portugal and Spain.

== Description ==
Both sexes are red, with black coloured head, legs, and antennae. The female prothorax is red, while males is black.
