= Stictoleptura pyrrha =

Scientific classification
- Kingdom: Animalia
- Phylum: Arthropoda
- Clade: Pancrustacea
- Class: Insecta
- Order: Coleoptera
- Suborder: Polyphaga
- Infraorder: Cucujiformia
- Family: Cerambycidae
- Genus: Stictoleptura
- Subgenus: Pyrrholeptura; Lazarev, 2016
- Species: S. pyrrha

Binomial name
- Stictoleptura pyrrha (Bates, 1884)

Synonyms
- Leptura pyrrha Bates, 1884; Anoplodera (Brachyleptura) pyrrha (Bates, 1884); Anoplodera pyrrha (Bates, 1884); Aredolpona pyrrha (Bates, 1884); Brachyleptura pyrrha (Bates, 1884); Leptura bouvieri Pic, 1901; Leptura (Leptura) pyrrha Bates, 1884; Paracorymbia (Batesiata) pyrrha (Bates, 1884); Paracorymbia (Pyrrholeptura) pyrrha (Bates, 1884); Stictoleptura (Stictoleptura) pyrrha (Bates, 1884); Stictoleptura pyrrha (Bates, 1884)

Species of beetle

Stictoleptura pyrrha is a specie of longhorn beetle in the family Cerambycidae. It is the only species in the subgenus Pyrrholeptura. It is endemic to Japan.
