= David Heinrich Hoppe =

German botanist (1760–1846)

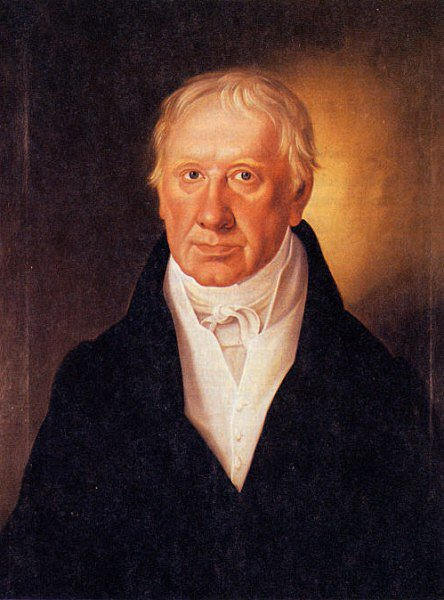
- Born: 15 December 1760; Vilsen, Hanover
- Died: 1 August 1846 (aged 85); Regensburg, Bavaria
- Education: University of Erlangen
- Known for: Studying the alpine flora
- Scientific career
- Fields: Botany

David Heinrich Hoppe (15 December 1760 – 1 August 1846) was a German pharmacist, botanist, entomologist and medical doctor. He is remembered for contributions made to the study of alpine flora.

== Life ==
Hoppe, a merchant's son from Vilsen, Hanover, began his career as a pharmacy apprentice in Celle, and subsequently was an assistant pharmacist in Hamburg, Halle, Wolfenbüttel and Regensburg. From 1792 onwards, he studied medicine and natural sciences at the University of Erlangen, and following graduation returned to Regensburg as a physician. Here he taught classes at the Regensburg lyceum.

He studied the flora of the Danube region surrounding Regensburg. In June 1798 he first explored the Untersberg massif near Salzburg, and almost each summer until 1843 continued his botanical excursions from Salzburg into the Eastern Alps. With bryologist Christian Friedrich Hornschuch (1793–1850), he published a treatise involving an extended scientific journey to the Adriatic coast and the mountains of Carinthia and Tyrol, called "Tagebuch einer Botanischen Reise nach den Küsten des Adriatischen Meeres und den Gebirgen von Kärnten, Tirol und Salzburg 1799". He explored the region around Heiligenblut and the Grossglockner several times, where he found and described Eriophorum scheuchzeri, Sesleria ovata, Polytrichum sexangulare, Pedicularis asplenifolia, and Braya alpina.

== Work ==
In May 1790, Hoppe founded the Regensburgische Botanische Gesellschaft (Regensburg Botanical Society), the first botanical society in Bavaria, and presently the world's oldest existing botanical society. Notable members included Johann Wolfgang von Goethe, Alexander von Humboldt, and Justus von Liebig. From 1812 until his death in 1846, Hoppe was its chair.

He is credited for describing and naming over 200 plant species. Among his written efforts are a work on the flora of Regensburg, titled "Ectypa plantarum ratisbonensium" (1787–1793), and "Caricologia Germanica" (1835), a book of German caricology that he published with engraver Jacob Sturm (1771–1848). From 1818 to 1842, he was editor of the popular scientific journal Flora. In 1825 he collaborated with Christian Friedrich Hornschuch, Jacob Sturm and Jacob Johann Hagenbach to publish an illustrated work on Alpine beetles entitled Insecta Coleoptrata, quae in itineribus suis, praesertim alpinis. Hoppe edited twelve exsiccata-like series, among them Herbarium vivum plantarum rariorum praesertim alpinarum exhibens plantas a Societatis botanici Ratisbonensis sodalibus in variis Germaniae regionibus collectas et Botanophilis communicatas (1898-1803). The exsiccata Plantae phanerogamicae, gramineae et cryptogamiceae selectae, quas in locis natalibus collegerunt et exsiccaverunt D. H. Hoppe et Fr. Hornschuch (1817) was co-edited by Christian Friedrich Hornschuch.

Hoppe became an elected member of the Academy of Sciences Leopoldina in 1820. The plant genus Hoppea from the family Gentianaceae is named after him.
