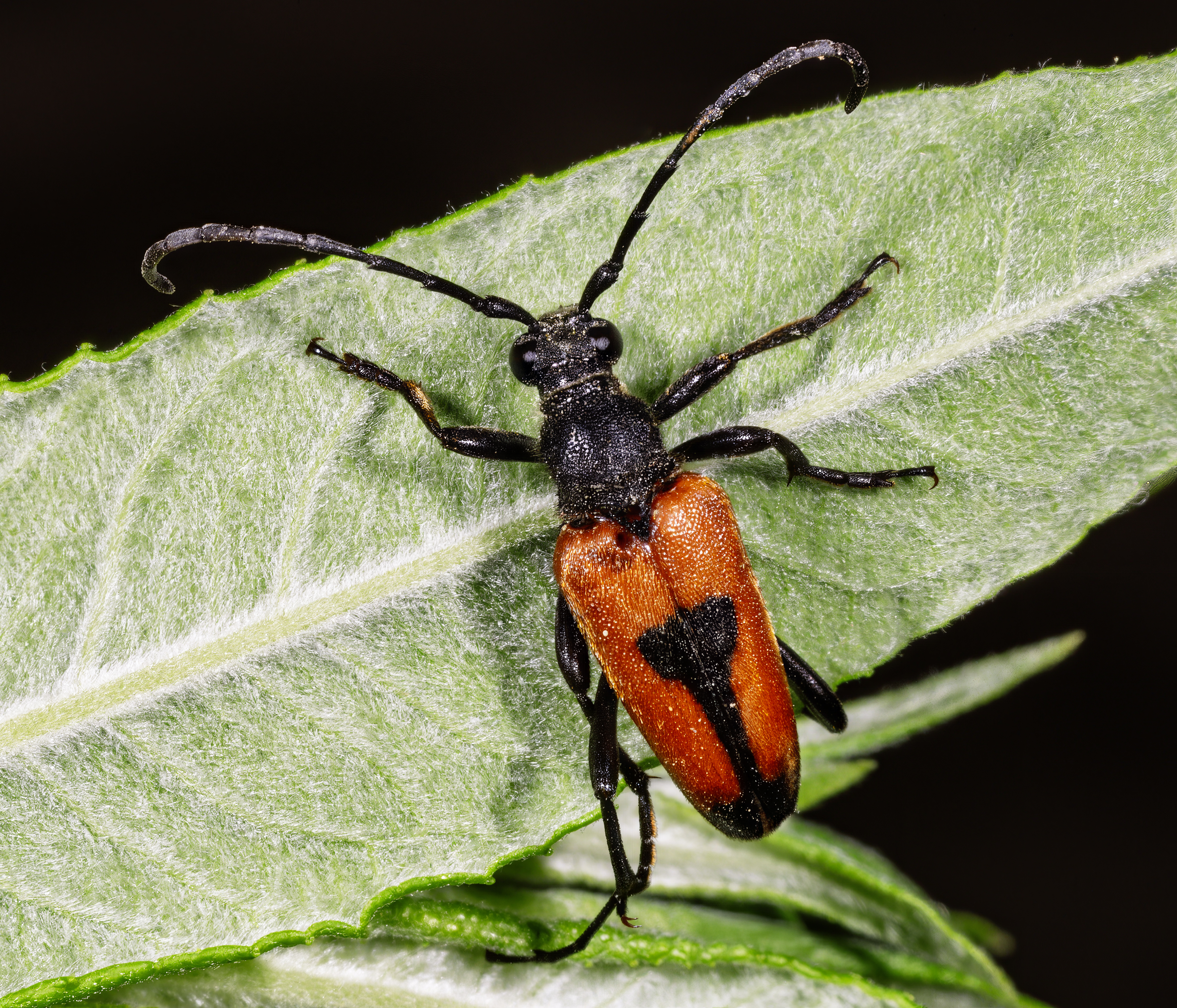
- Stictoleptura cordigera

Scientific classification
- Domain: Eukaryota
- Kingdom: Animalia
- Phylum: Arthropoda
- Class: Insecta
- Order: Coleoptera
- Suborder: Polyphaga
- Infraorder: Cucujiformia
- Family: Cerambycidae
- Genus: Stictoleptura
- Species: S. cordigera

Binomial name
- Stictoleptura cordigera (Fussli, 1775)

Synonyms
- Aredolpona cordigera (Fuesly) Vives, 2001; Brachyleptura cordigera (Füssli) Villiers, 1974; Corymbia cordigera (Füssli) Sama, 1988; Leptura hastata Sulzer, 1776; Paracorymbia cordigera (Füssli) Danilevsky, 2002; Leptura cordigera Füssli, 1775; Stenocorus lamed Fabricius) Rossi, 1790

= Stictoleptura cordigera =

Species of beetle

Stictoleptura cordigera is a beetle species belonging to the longhorn beetle family, subfamily Lepturinae.

== Distribution ==
This beetle is mainly present in Spain, France, Belgium, Switzerland, Italy, Albania, Romania, Bulgaria, and Greece. It is also found in Turkey and North Iran.

== Ecology ==
=== Larvae ===
Larvae are polyphagous and develop in rotten wood of deciduous trees, especially in Quercus ilex and Quercus suber, but also in Pistacia and Castanea species.

=== Adult ===
The adults grow up to 14–20 millimetres (0.55–0.79 in) and can be encountered from June through August, completing their life cycle in two-three years.

== Description ==
The head, pronotum and abdomen are black, while elytra have a bright reddish colour with a specific black drawing. They are very common flower-visitors, especially in Apiaceae species, feeding on pollen and the nectar.

== Subspecies ==
- Stictoleptura cordigera cordigera (Fuesslin, 1775)
- Stictoleptura cordigera illyrica (Müller, 1948)
- Stictoleptura cordigera anojaensis (Sláma, 1982)
