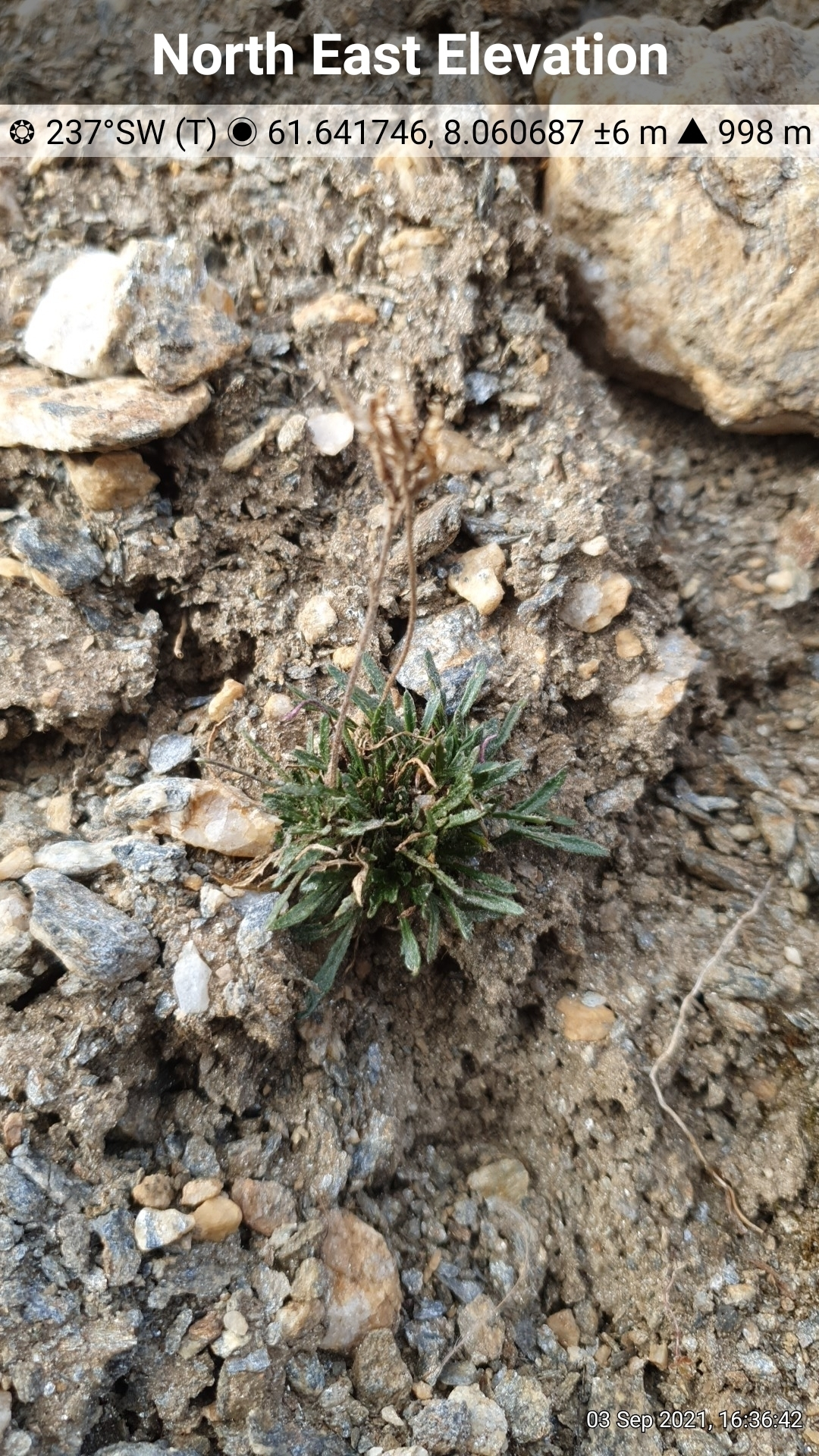

Scientific classification
- Kingdom: Plantae
- Clade: Tracheophytes
- Clade: Angiosperms
- Clade: Eudicots
- Clade: Rosids
- Order: Brassicales
- Family: Brassicaceae
- Genus: Braya
- Species: B. linearis

Binomial name
- Braya linearis Rouy

= Braya linearis =

Species of flowering plant

Braya linearis is a species of flowering plant belonging to the family Brassicaceae. Its native range is Greenland, Norway, Sweden.
