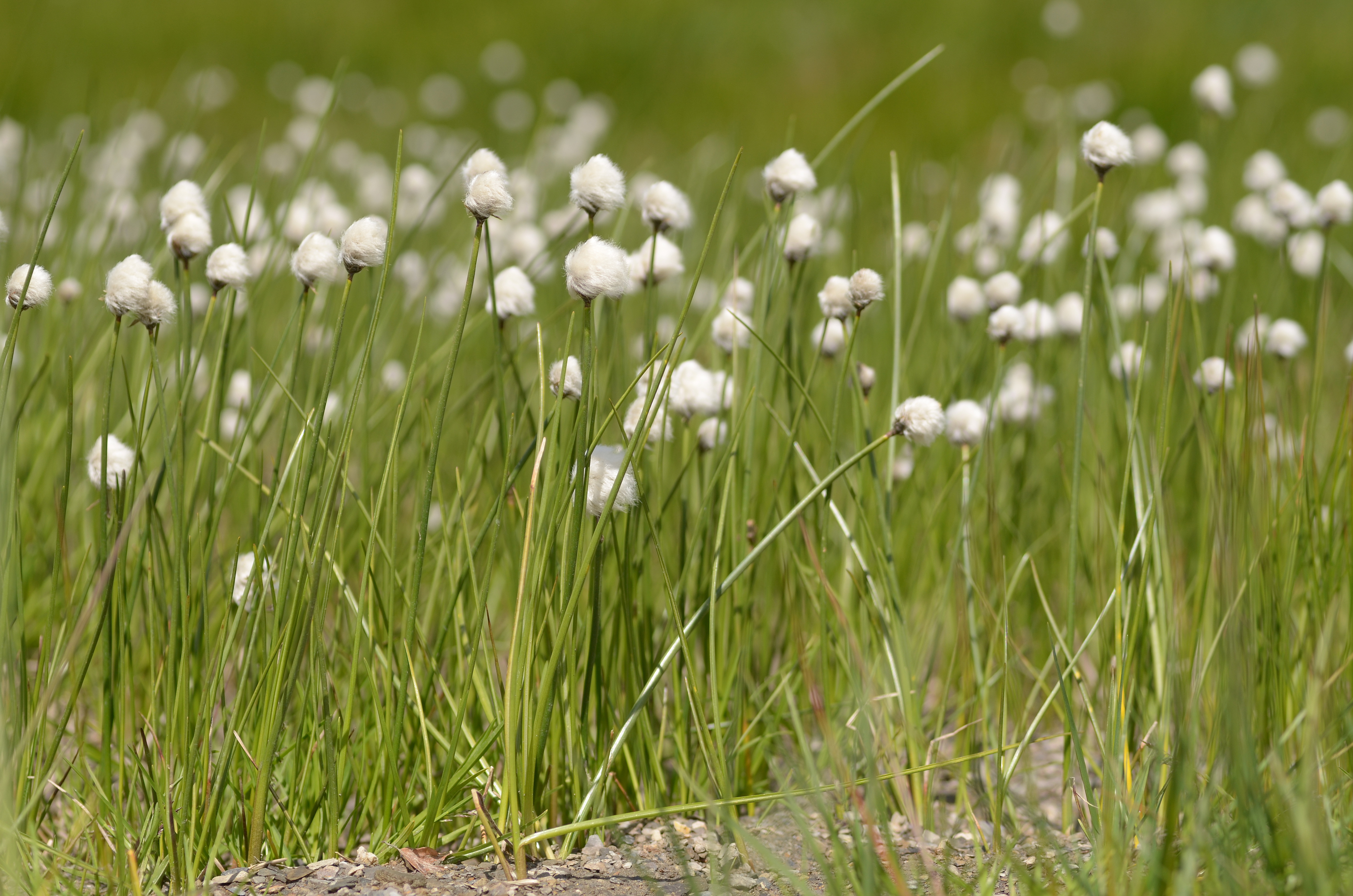

Conservation status
- Secure (NatureServe)

Scientific classification
- Kingdom: Plantae
- Clade: Embryophytes
- Clade: Tracheophytes
- Clade: Angiosperms
- Clade: Monocots
- Clade: Commelinids
- Order: Poales
- Family: Cyperaceae
- Genus: Eriophorum
- Species: E. scheuchzeri

Binomial name
- Eriophorum scheuchzeri Hoppe

= Eriophorum scheuchzeri =

Species of flowering plant in the sedge family

Eriophorum scheuchzeri is a species of flowering plant in the sedge family known by the common names Scheuchzer's cottongrass and white cottongrass. It has an arctic circumpolar and circumboreal distribution in the Northern Hemisphere. It can be found in Alaska, across Canada, in the Arctic islands, Greenland, Iceland, and across Eurasia. Disjunct occurrences exist in the Rocky Mountains, in the high mountains of southern Europe (the Pyrenees, Alps, and the Caucasus) and on Mount Daisetsu in Japan and some other Asian mountains.

== Description ==
This species is a perennial herb producing colonies via its rhizomes. The thin stems may reach 70 cm (28 in) tall, but they are often much shorter. The rolled leaf blades are up to 12 cm (4.7 in) long. Leaves at the top of the stem have no blades, just black-tipped sheaths. The inflorescence is a solitary flower head with wispy, cottony, bright white, red-tinged, or silvery bristles up to 3 cm (1.2 in) long.

== Taxonomy ==
Eriophorum scheuchzeri was described and named by the German botanist David Heinrich Hoppe in 1800.

== Distribution and habitat ==
This plant can be found at sea level in northern parts of its range and at over 4,000 m (13,000 ft) in elevation farther south. It is a helophyte. It is restricted to wet habitat types, and grows in marshes and wet meadows, by ponds and lakes, and on riverbanks, in moist and wet gravel and sand substrates. It often lines the edges of standing water bodies commonly associated with mosses and other sedges, such as Carex aquatilis.

== Uses ==
Native and indigenous peoples have long been familiar with the plant and its uses. The Inuit have at least three names for Scheuchzer's cottongrass: pualunnguat, meaning "imitation mittens"; kumaksiutinnguat, meaning "an imitation object to remove lice"; and in North Baffin, kanguujat, meaning "what looks like snow geese". It has been used as lamp wicks, boot insoles, and swabs. The cottony flowers have been used as dressings to absorb wound drainage. The plant is also edible and sweet-tasting.

This plant is consumed by muskoxen. Waterfowl feed on the seeds.

== Bibliography ==
- Cayouette, Jacques (2004). "A taxonomic review of the Eriophorum russeolum—E. scheuchzeri complex (Cyperaceae) in North America". SIDA, Contributions to Botany. 21 (2): 791–814.
