= Stictoleptura tripartita =

Scientific classification
- Domain: Eukaryota
- Kingdom: Animalia
- Phylum: Arthropoda
- Class: Insecta
- Order: Coleoptera
- Suborder: Polyphaga
- Infraorder: Cucujiformia
- Family: Cerambycidae
- Genus: Stictoleptura
- Species: S. tripartita

Binomial name
- Stictoleptura tripartita (Heyden, 1889)

Synonyms
- Leptura tripartita Heyden, 1889; Paracorymbia tripartita (Heyden) Danilevsky, 2002

Species of beetle

Stictoleptura tripartita is a species of beetle in the family Cerambycidae found in Iran, Syria and Turkey.

== Description ==
The species is red-black coloured. They live 2–3 years, and fly from June–August.
