= Stictoleptura deyrollei =

Scientific classification
- Kingdom: Animalia
- Phylum: Arthropoda
- Class: Insecta
- Order: Coleoptera
- Suborder: Polyphaga
- Infraorder: Cucujiformia
- Family: Cerambycidae
- Genus: Stictoleptura
- Species: S. deyrollei

Binomial name
- Stictoleptura deyrollei (Pic, 1895)

Synonyms
- Brachyleptura deyrollei (Pic) Sama, 1982; Paracorymbia deyrollei (Pic) Danilevsky, 2002; Leptura deyrollei Pic, 1895

Species of beetle

Stictoleptura deyrollei is a species of beetle in the family Cerambycidae that is endemic to Turkey and North Iran.

== Description ==
Both sexes are brown, with 2 big black dots on the wings. They can range from 12–16 millimetres (0.47–0.63 in). They fly from June to August, and live for 2–3 years.
