= Ernst Wilhelm Martius =

German botanist (1756–1849)

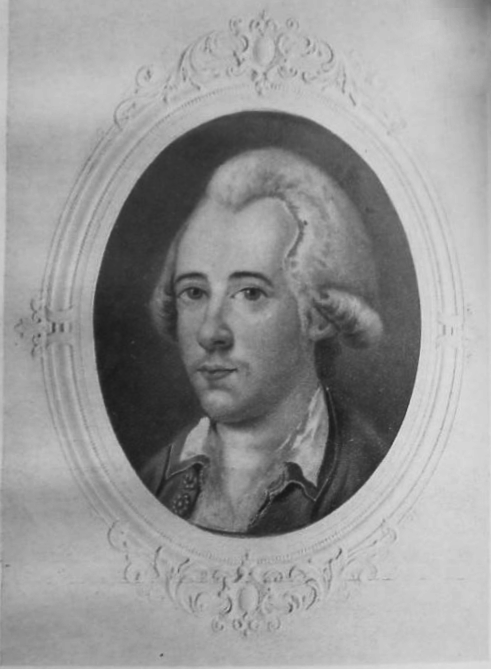
- Martius in 1794
- Born: September 10, 1756; Weißenstadt, Upper Franconia
- Died: December 12, 1849 (aged 93)
- Known for: pharmacy; botany
- Children: 2
- Scientific career
- Author abbrev. (botany): E.Mart.

Ernst Wilhelm Martius (10 September 1756 – 12 December 1849) was a German apothecary and an honorary professor of pharmacy at Erlangen University. He co-founded a botanical society in Regensburg.

Martius was born in Weißenstadt, Upper Franconia to Johanna and Philipp Conrad Samuel Martius, a deacon. He went to school in Kulmbach. He trained as a pharmacist from 1772 at Erlangen and apprenticed in Coburg and Kaufbeuren becoming a pharmacist in Regensburg in 1779. He was a co-founder of the Regensburger Botanische Gesellschaft. He later moved to Dillenburg, Strasbourg, Mains and finally settled in Erlangen from 1791. He also became a court and university pharmacist, lecturing from 1818 to 1824. To support his teaching, he collected medicinal plants and materials across the world and began to set up a collection which is now called the Martius Pharmacognostic Collection (consisting of nearly 2400 items collected by him and his two sons). This developed into the department of pharmaceutical sciences at University of Erlangen in Germany. His students included Theodor Friedrich Ludwig Nees von Esenbeck (1787-1837).

He was married to Regina and their sons Theodor Wilhelm Christian Martius (1796–1863) and Carl Friedrich Philipp von Martius became an apothecary and botanist respectively.

== Publications ==
Martius was the author of several books. These included two where illustrations were made using impressions of the plant material (nature printing), rather than drawings or engravings. He developed a method that ensured an even layer of ink over the plant material supported on a copper plate and thus higher-quality images. Titles were:

- Icones Planatarum Originales (Original Images of Plants) (1780)
- Neueste Anweisung, Pflanzen nach dem Leben abzudrucken (New Instructions on Taking Prints from Fresh Plants) (1784)

In 1847 he wrote an autobiographical memoir.
