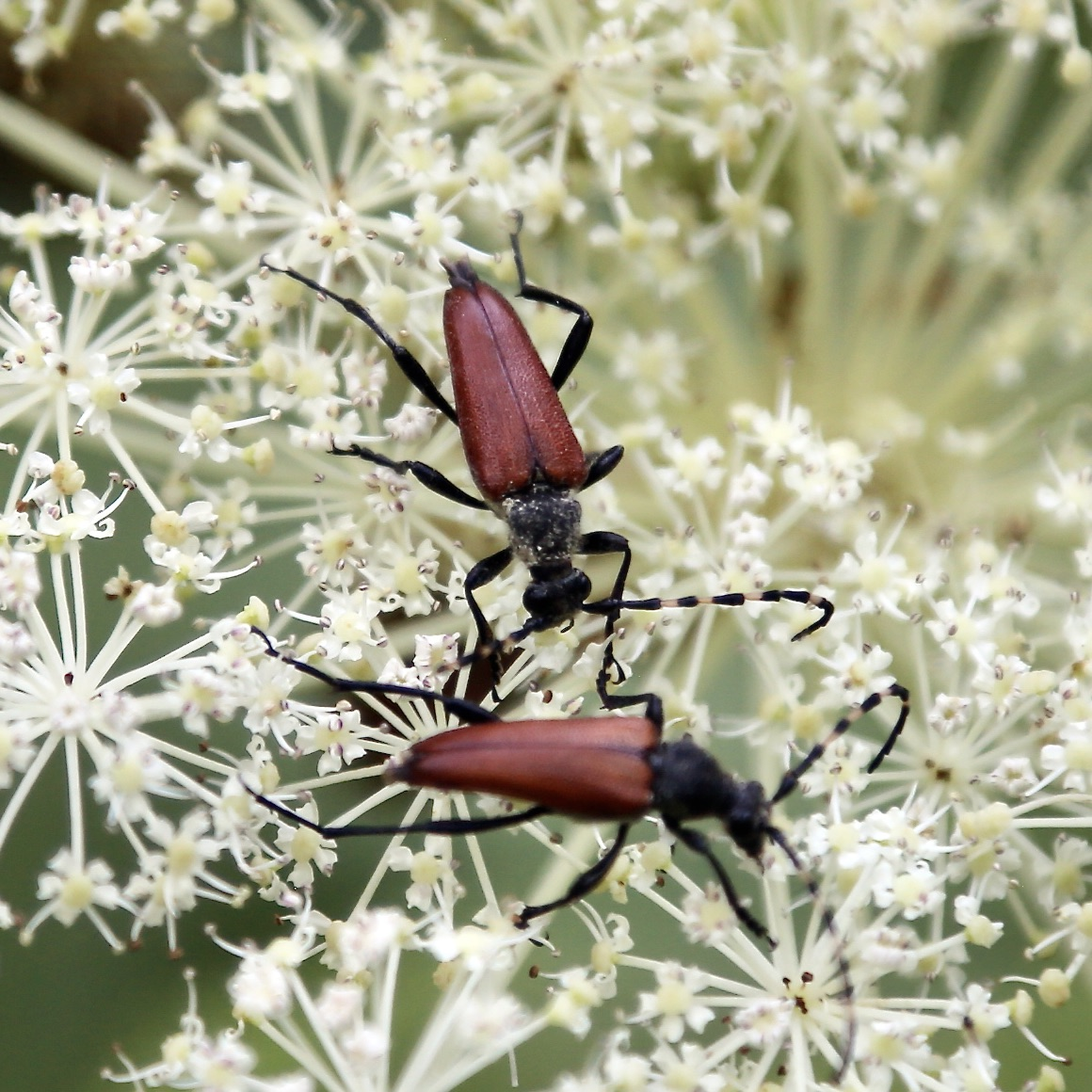

Scientific classification
- Kingdom: Animalia
- Phylum: Arthropoda
- Class: Insecta
- Order: Coleoptera
- Suborder: Polyphaga
- Infraorder: Cucujiformia
- Family: Cerambycidae
- Genus: Stictoleptura
- Species: S. variicornis

Binomial name
- Stictoleptura variicornis (Dalman, 1817)

Synonyms
- Aredolpona variicornis (Dalman) Nakane & Ohbayashi, 1957; Corymbia variicornis (Dalman) Ohbayashi, 1963; Leptura variicornis Dalman, 1817

= Stictoleptura variicornis =

Species of beetle

Stictoleptura variicornis is a species of longhorn beetle in the Lepturinae subfamily. It was described by Johan Wilhelm Dalman in 1817 and can be found in Poland, Russia, Ukraine, and the Baltic States. It can also be found in Asian countries like Mongolia and North Korea.

== Description ==
The species is brown coloured with blackish-brown legs and antennae. The life span is 3 years, with a flight from June–August. Larvae live beneath the bark of dead wood, creating a pupal cell after its second hibernation. It can be found near Filipendula palmata flowers.
