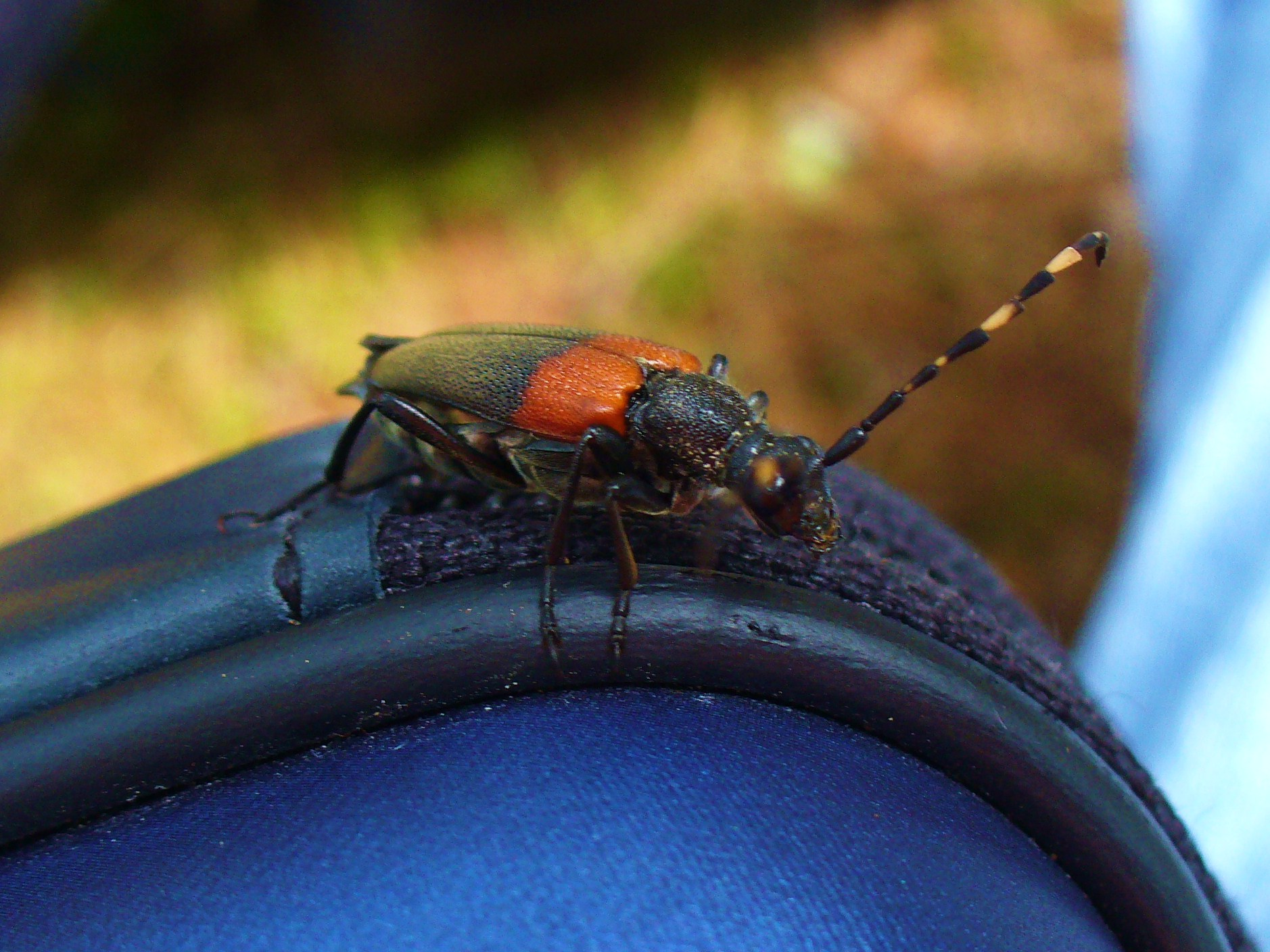

Scientific classification
- Kingdom: Animalia
- Phylum: Arthropoda
- Clade: Pancrustacea
- Class: Insecta
- Order: Coleoptera
- Suborder: Polyphaga
- Infraorder: Cucujiformia
- Family: Cerambycidae
- Genus: Stictoleptura
- Species: S. canadensis

Binomial name
- Stictoleptura canadensis (Olivier, 1795)

Synonyms
- Anoplodera canadensis (Olivier) Chagnon, 1933; Brachyleptura canadensis (Olivier) Casey, 1913; Leptura canadensis Olivier, 1795; Leptura cinnamoptera Haldeman, 1847 nec Randall, 1838; Leptura erythroptera Kirby, 1837 nec Hagenbach, 1822; Leptura tenuicornis Haldeman, 1847

= Stictoleptura canadensis =

Species of beetle

Stictoleptura canadensis, commonly known as the red-shouldered pine borer, is a species of beetle in the family Cerambycidae found in Canada and the United States.

== Habitat ==
=== Larvae ===
The larvae feed on dead, or decaying wood, but sometimes use a living plant as a host. Girdlers eat living branches or twigs. The larvae move freely through the soil, feeding upon roots, or tunneling under the root crown.

=== Adult ===
The adults feed on flowers. Every adult have different feeding requirement, some may like sap, while others, may prefer bark, leaves, blossoms, fruits, or fungi. Some even drink water only. In a temperate climate, the species life span, as a larva, is 1–3 years. However, cycles of 2–3 months, even decades have been recorded. Adult beetles quickly emerge, later disperse, following by reproduction, and death, all which takes from 3 days to couple of months.

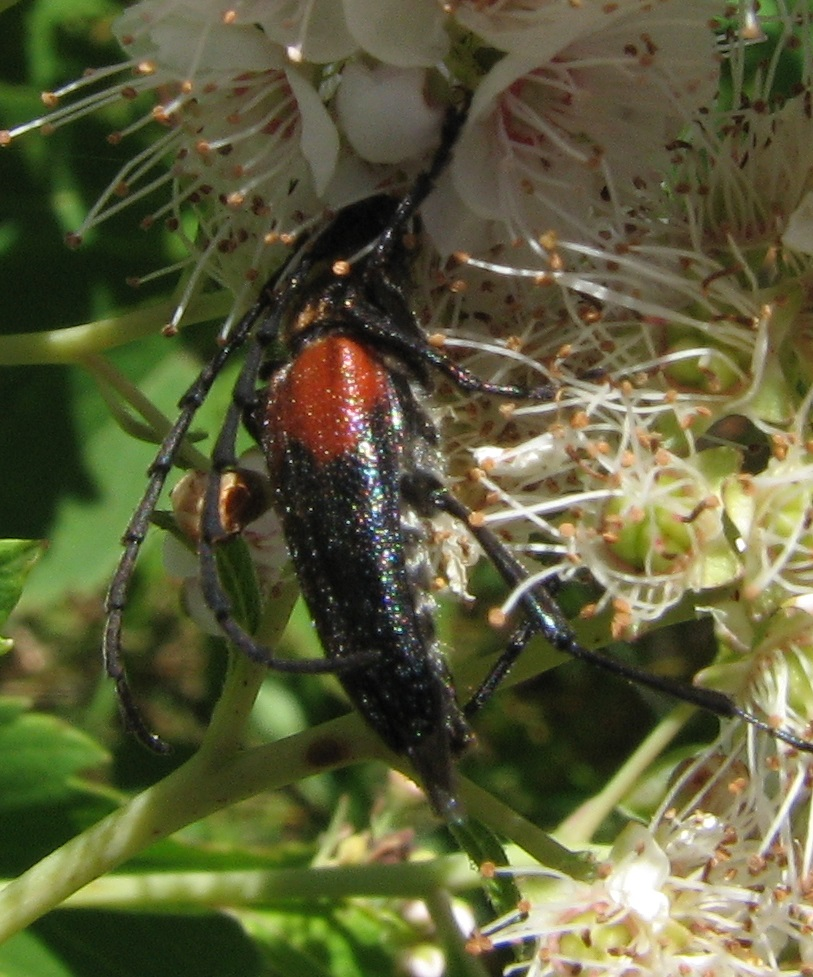
