= Braya thorild-wulffii =

Conservation status
- Apparently Secure (NatureServe)

Scientific classification
- Kingdom: Plantae
- Clade: Tracheophytes
- Clade: Angiosperms
- Clade: Eudicots
- Clade: Rosids
- Order: Brassicales
- Family: Brassicaceae
- Genus: Braya
- Species: B. thorild-wulffii

Binomial name
- Braya thorild-wulffii Ostenf.

Synonyms
- Braya pilosa subsp. thorild-wulffii (Ostenf.) V.V. Petrovsky; Braya purpurascens subsp. thorild-wulffii (Ostenf.) Hultén; Braya purpurascens var. thorild-wulffii (Ostenf.) B. Boivin

Species of flowering plant

Braya thorild-wulffii, the Greenland northern rockcress, is a plant species native to Greenland, Nunavut the Canadian Northwest Territories, and from the Chukotka Autonomous Okrug of eastern Russia.

Braya thorild-wulffii is an herb up to 10 cm (3.9 in) tall, sometimes hairy, sometimes not. Leaves are spatula-shaped, up to 4 cm (1.6 in) long. Flowers are white to purplish, up to 10 mm (0.39 in) in diameter. Fruits spherical or egg-shaped, up to 10 mm (0.39 in) in diameter.
