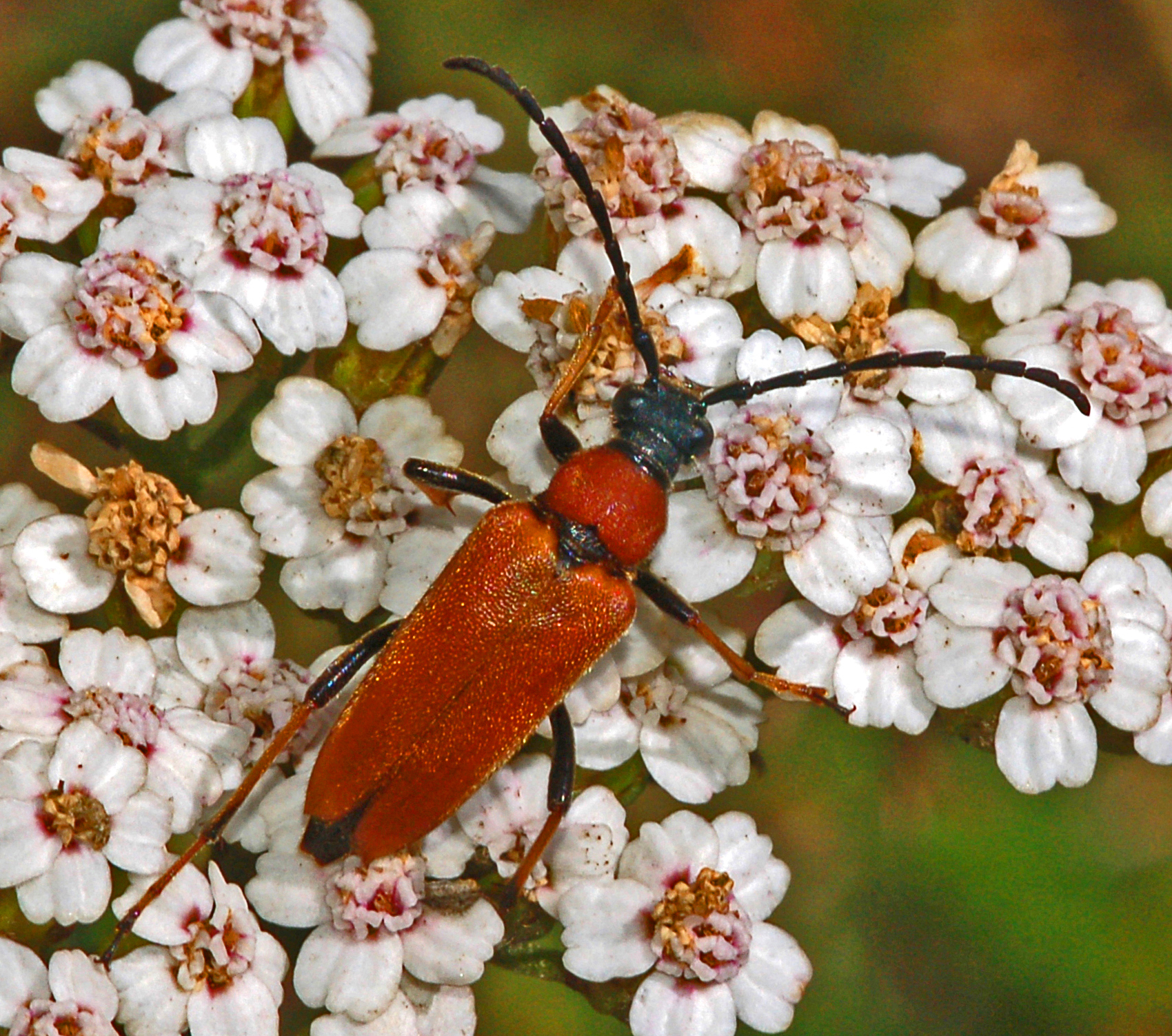
- Stictoleptura rubra

Scientific classification
- Kingdom: Animalia
- Phylum: Arthropoda
- Clade: Pancrustacea
- Class: Insecta
- Order: Coleoptera
- Suborder: Polyphaga
- Infraorder: Cucujiformia
- Family: Cerambycidae
- Subfamily: Lepturinae
- Tribe: Lepturini
- Genus: Stictoleptura; Casey, 1924

Synonyms
- Aredolpona Nakane & Ohbayashi, 1957; Batesiata Miroshnikov, 1998; Corymbia Des Gozis, 1886; Maculileptura Danilevsky, 2014; Melanoleptura Miroshnikov, 1998; Miroshnikovia Danilevsky, 2014; Variileptura Danilevsky, 2014

= Stictoleptura =

Genus of beetles

Stictoleptura is a genus of longhorn beetle in the family Cerambycidae.

== Species ==
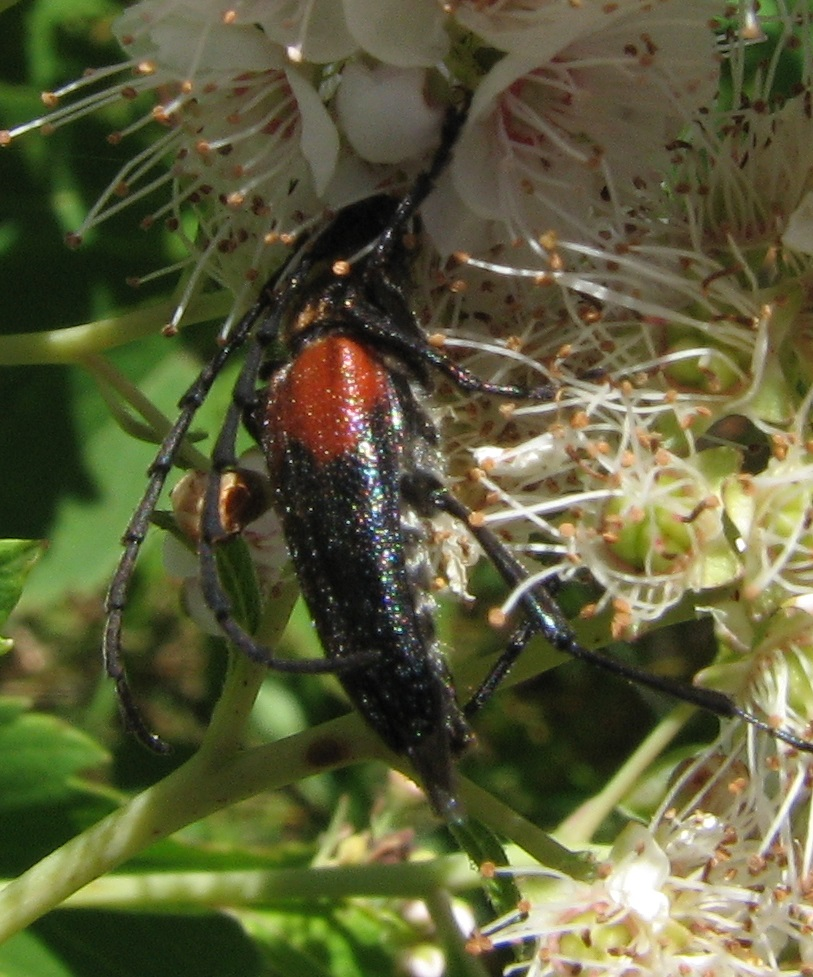
Stictoleptura canadensis canadensis

Apparently when this Stictoleptura rubra beetle emerged from its pupa, its wings didn’t fully expand before they hardened, making flight impossible.

Species within this genus include:

- Stictoleptura antiqua (Vitali, 2005)
- Stictoleptura bartoniana (Cockerell, 1920)
- Stictoleptura benjamini (Sama, 1993)
- Stictoleptura canadensis (Olivier, 1795) – red-shouldered pine borer
- Stictoleptura cardinalis (Daniel K. & Daniel J., 1898)
- Stictoleptura cordigera (Fueßlins, 1775)
- Stictoleptura deyrollei (Pic, 1895)
- Stictoleptura dichroa (Blanchard, 1871)
- Stictoleptura erythroptera (Hagenbach, 1822)
- Stictoleptura excisipes (Daniel K. & Daniel J., 1891)
- Stictoleptura fontenayi (Mulsant, 1839)
- Stictoleptura gladiatrix Sama, 2008
- Stictoleptura heydeni (Ganglbauer, 1888)
- Stictoleptura igai (Tamanuki, 1943)
- Stictoleptura ivoroberti Sama, 2010
- Stictoleptura oblongomaculata (Buquet, 1840)
- Stictoleptura ondreji (Sláma, 1993)
- Stictoleptura otini (Peyerimhoff, 1949)
- Stictoleptura palmi (Demelt, 1972)
- Stictoleptura picticornis (Reitter, 1885)
- Stictoleptura pyrrha (Bates, 1884)
- Stictoleptura rubripennis (Pic, 1927)
- Stictoleptura rubra (Linnaeus, 1758) – red-brown longhorn beetle
- Stictoleptura rufa (Brullé, 1832)
- Stictoleptura scutellata (Fabricius, 1781)
- Stictoleptura simplonica (Fairmaire, 1885)
- Stictoleptura slamai Sama, 2010
- Stictoleptura stragulata (Germar, 1824)
- Stictoleptura tangeriana (Tournier, 1875)
- Stictoleptura tripartita (Heyden, 1889)
- Stictoleptura trisignata (Fairmaire, 1852)
- Stictoleptura variicornis (Dalman, 1817)
