= Christian Friedrich Hornschuch =

German botanist (1793–1850)

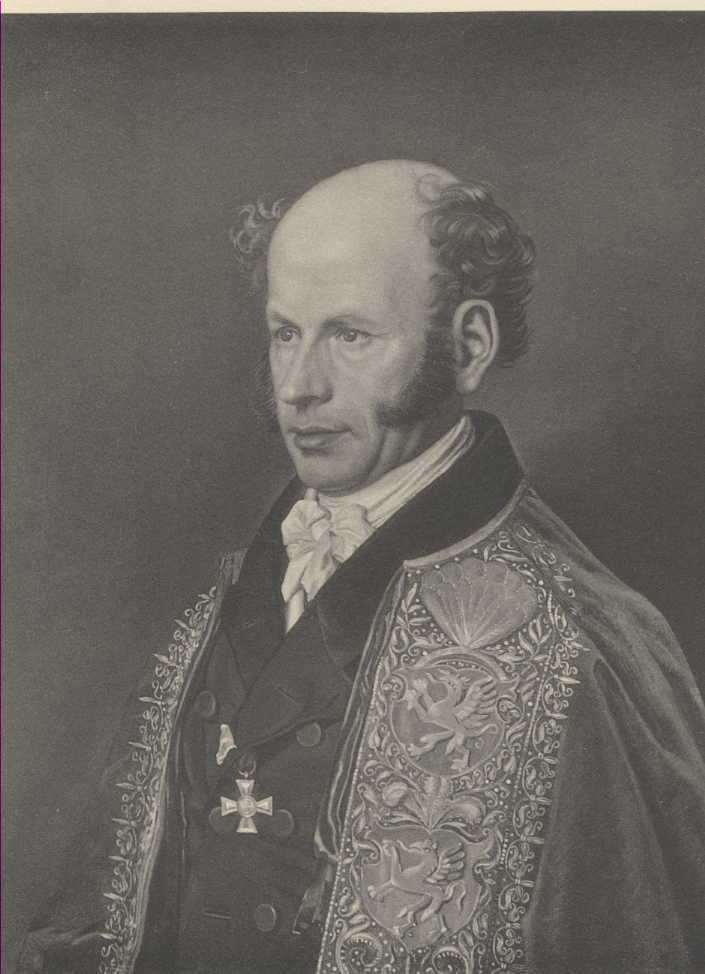
Christian Friedrich Hornschuch.

Christian Friedrich Hornschuch (21 August 1793 – 24 December 1850) was a German botanist.

== Biography ==
Hornschuch was born in Rodach, Bavaria. In 1808 he started his career as an apprentice at a pharmacy in Hildburghausen. In 1813 he moved to Regensburg as an assistant to botanist David Heinrich Hoppe (1760–1846), and afterwards worked as an assistant to Heinrich Christian Funck (1771–1839) in Gefrees, where he performed research of mosses (Bryopsida) native to the Fichtel Mountains.

In 1816 he accompanied Hoppe on a botanical expedition to the Adriatic coast, then returned to Coburg to arrange his diaries, and in April 1817 continued his research with Hoppe in Tyrol and Carinthia. Later he worked as a "botanical demonstrator" at the University of Greifswald, and for a period of time studied with Carl Adolph Agardh (1785–1859) from the University of Lund. Between 1817 and 1818 he and Hoppe co-edited two exsiccata-like series, namely Plantae cryptogamae selectae and Plantae phanerogamicae, gramineae et cryptogamiceae selectae, quas in locis natalibus collegerunt et exsiccaverunt D. H. Hoppe et Fr. Hornschuch.

In 1820 he was appointed associate professor of natural history and botany, and director of the botanical gardens at the University of Greifswald. In 1827, he attained the title of "full professor".

In 1821, botanist Christian Gottfried Daniel Nees von Esenbeck named a genus of flowering plants (in family Annonaceae) from Brazil as Hornschuchia.

== Publications ==
Hornschuch specialized in the field of bryology, and with botanist Christian Gottfried Daniel Nees von Esenbeck (1776–1858) and engraver Jacob Sturm (1771–1848), he was co-author of Bryologia Germanica (1823–31). He translated a number of Danish and Swedish works, and was the author of the following publications:

- Tagebuch auf einer Reise nach den Küsten des adriatischen Meeres (Diary of a journey to the shores of the Adriatic Sea), 1818
- De Voitia et Systolio. novis muscorum frondosorum generibus (1818)
- Flora oder botanische Zeitung, founded with David Heinrich Hoppe as a publication of the Royal Bavarian Botanical Society of Regensburg
- Einige Beobachtungen über die Entstehung und Metamorphose der niederen vegetabilischen Organismen (Some observations on the formation and metamorphism of the lower vegetable organisms). In: Flora (1819)
- with David Heinrich Hoppe, Jacob Sturm and Jacob Johann Hagenbach Insecta coleoptrata, quae in itineribus suis, prasertim Alpinis, collegerunt (1825)
