= Stictoleptura trisignata =

Scientific classification
- Domain: Eukaryota
- Kingdom: Animalia
- Phylum: Arthropoda
- Class: Insecta
- Order: Coleoptera
- Suborder: Polyphaga
- Infraorder: Cucujiformia
- Family: Cerambycidae
- Genus: Stictoleptura
- Species: S. trisignata

Binomial name
- Stictoleptura trisignata (Fairmaire, 1852)

Synonyms
- Aredolpona trisignata (Fairmaire) Vives, 2001; Brachyleptura trisignata (Fairmaire) Villiers, 1974; Brachyleptura trisignata var. gallica Villiers, 1978; Corymbia trisignata (Fairmaire) Sama, 1988; Leptura rufa var. trisignata Fairmaire, 1852; Paracorymbia trisignata (Fairmaire) Danilevsky, 2002

Species of beetle

Stictoleptura trisignata is a species of longhorn beetle in the Lepturinae subfamily. It was described by Léon Fairmaire in 1852. It can be found in France, Portugal and Spain.
