= Regensburg Botanical Society =

German learned society specialising in plants

Regensburg Botanical Society (Regensburgische Botanische Gesellschaft)
- Formation: 1790
- Legal status: Not-for-profit organisation
- Purpose: The promotion of the study, conservation and appreciation of plants, especially of the local flora
- Location: Regensburg, Bavaria, Germany
- Website: rbg1790.de

The Regensburg Botanical Society (Regensburgische Botanische Gesellschaft), founded 1790 in the city of Regensburg, Bavaria, Germany, is the oldest extant scientific society focused on botany. It was initially supported by the Prince-Archbishop Karl Theodor von Dalberg of Regensburg. Over the centuries the society has held scientific meetings, published scientific journals and had a botanic garden (until 1855), herbarium and library. In the twentieth century the society extended its role into nature conservation. It currently collaborates closely with the University of Regensburg.

== Foundation ==
The Regensburg Botanical Society was founded 14 May 1790 by the botanist David Heinrich Hoppe. It was previously known as the Royal Bavarian Botanical Society of Regensburg (Königlich Bayerische Botanische Gesellschaft zu Regensburg).

The first 'meeting' took place in the open air near Regensburg in what is now the Max-Schultze-Steig nature reserve. The location was adjacent to prominent cliffs with a cave above the river Danube that provides some shelter and was subsequently called the 'Hoppefelsen' in memory of Hoppe. He walked there accompanied by his friends Ernst Wilhelm Martius, Johann August Stallknecht and Heinrich Christian Funck, all pharmacists, and then read a statement of the aims and rules of the new Regensburg Botanical Society. Several prominent local people soon joined, including two Frenchmen, Charles François Marie Duval and François Gabriel de Bray, the French ambassador to Regensburg.

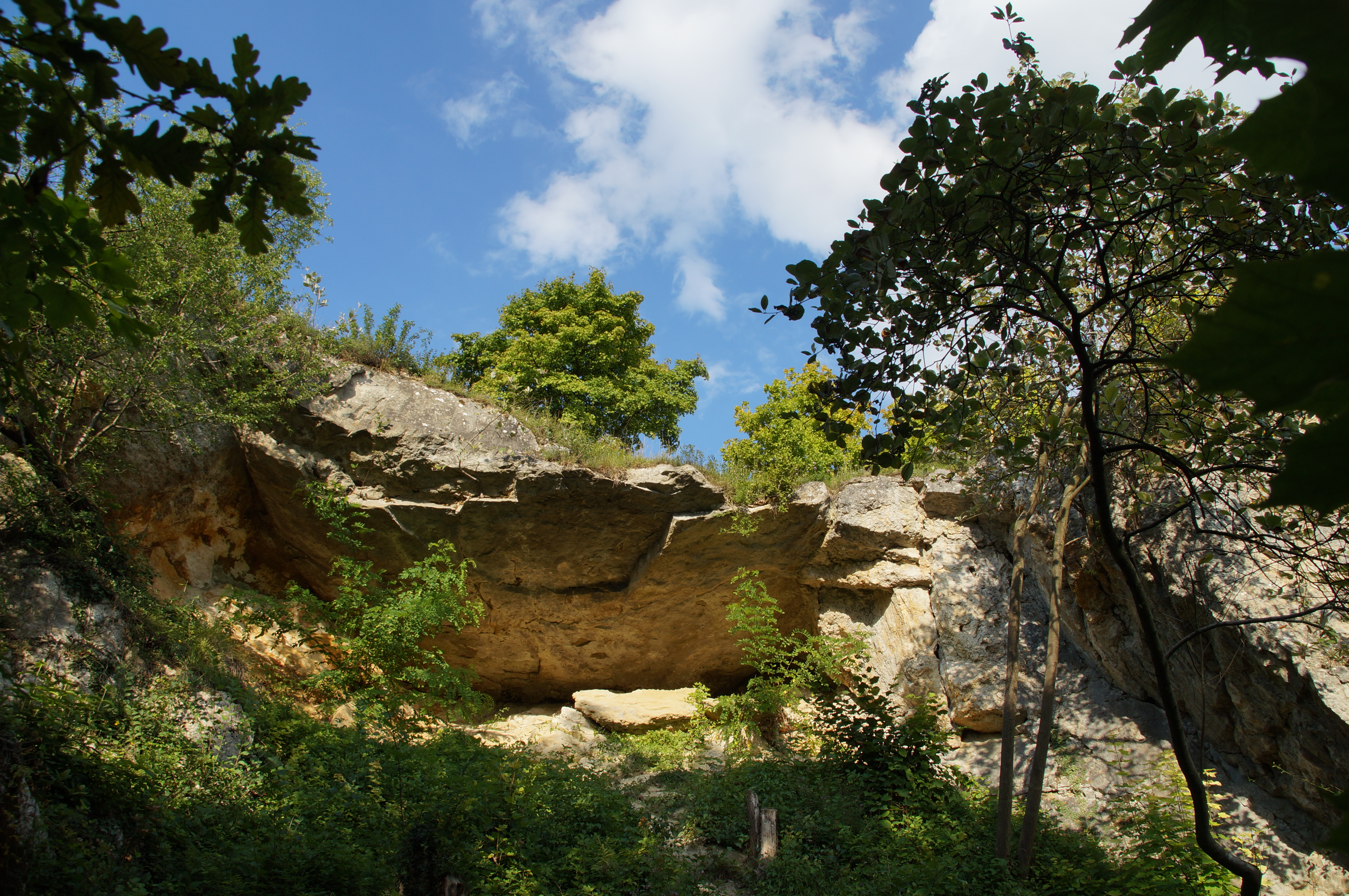
The Schutzfelsen (Protective rock) where the first meeting of the Regensburg Botanical Society took place.

A commemorative plaque in French was installed in 1792 and has been restored, translated and extended in 1890 and 1975. It states:

David Heinrich Hoppe, during one of his botanical excursions, surprised by a violent thunderstorm, took shelter under these rocks, which he called protective rocks (Schutzfelsen).

The Botanical Society of Regensburg, which he founded in May 1790, gave him credit and consecrated this area favored by flora.
F. G. De Bray and C. Duval

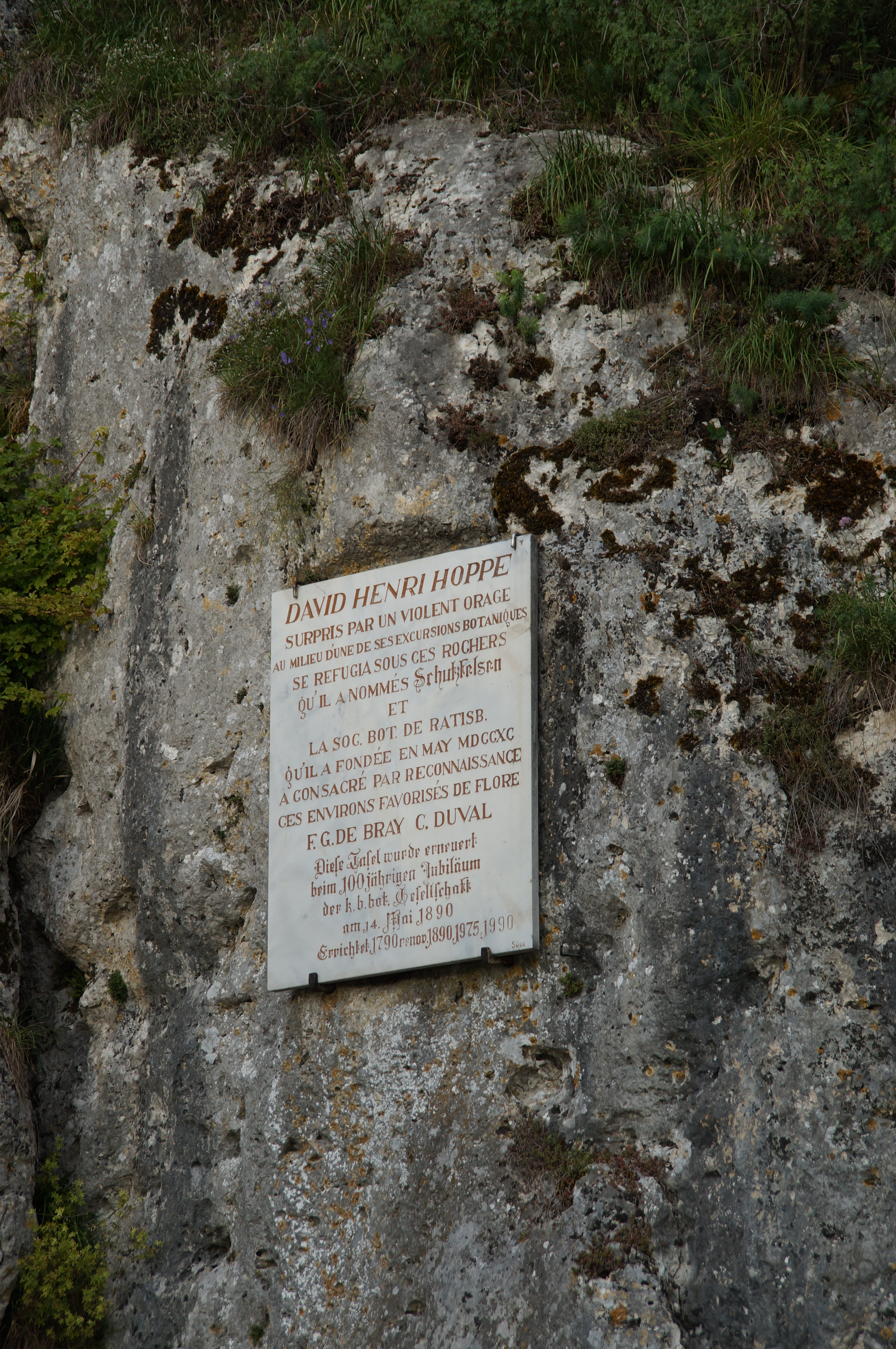
Plaque about founding of the Regensburg Botanical Society.

== History of the society ==
The ruler of the Principality of Regensburg, Prince-Archbishop Karl Theodor von Dalberg supported the society in its early years. He gave it the garden of Saint Emmeram's Abbey, which had had a long tradition of scientific enquiry. From 1803 until 1855 the society maintained a botanical garden there. The society also started a herbarium focusing on plants found in Germany. By the 1820s it contained 3,265 specimens along with some from other parts of the world. The most substantial donation of additional material to the herbarium, 20,000 specimens, was from the estate of Baron Franz Ludwig von Welden, an Austrian army officer who travelled widely. In addition the society began to form a specialist library, which by 1805 contained 216 titles.

In the early 1900s, as nature conservation began to be appreciated the society's chair, Heinrich Karl August Fürnrohr, led the society to purchase several areas of land for conservation value. These included in 1905 Drabafelsen near Etterzhausen, in 1906 the Schutzfelsen where the society was founded and in 1911 the Sippenauer Moor. The society disposed of some of the herbarium and library during the early-twentieth century. From the 1950s the society developed a new journal (Hoppea), increased activity related to conservation and new connections with other regional scientific societies. In 1974 the society became part of the University of Regensburg and the books (in 1974), herbarium (in 1977) and society's archives (in 1984) were added to the university's collections as permanent loans. Conservation work has been undertaken on the documents and herbarium specimens, and the herbarium is now housed in modern facilities. The change in the society's fortunes has been reflected in an increase in the number of members which has been around 600 since 1999.

== Publications ==
The society has published several scientific journals over the years:

- Botanical Pocket Book for Beginners of this Science and the Art of Pharmacy, (Botanisches Taschenbuch für die Anfänger dieser Wissenschaft und der Apothekerkunst) published from 1790 (renamed New Botanical Pocket Book for Beginners of Science and the Art of Pharmacy (Neues Botanisches Taschenbuch für die Anfänger dieser Wissenschaft und der Apothekerkunst) in 1805), which was the first botanical journal to be published in Germany
- Memoranda of the Regensburg Botanical Society (Denkschriften der Regensburgischen Botanischen Gesellschaft) renamed Hoppea from 1971. This was published intermittently from 1792 onwards. In 1861 a volume about the Bavarian lichen flora by August von Krempelhuber appeared.
- The Botanical Newspaper (Botanische Zeitung) was published from 1807 until 1817.
- Flora was started in 1818 by Hoppe and Christian Friedrich Hornschuch as a successor to the Botanical Newspaper and was published by the society until 1888. It was then taken on by other publishers and is still in existence.
- Flora Exsiccata Bavarica, a series of numbered collections of the dried plants of Bavaria was produced from 1898 until 1930 and distributed as exsiccata work.
- Regensburg Mycological Writings (Regensburger Mykologische Schriften) is about all aspects of fungi, especially in Bavaria. This has been published since 1993 with Andreas Bresinsky and Helmut Besl as the first editors, followed by Peter Poschlod.

== Awards ==
The society has made several awards over the years:

- An award for outstanding botanical work has been made at irregular intervals.
- The Anton de Bary prize for outstanding achievements in the fields of plant systematics and mycology was established in 1993.

== Presidents and significant members of the society ==
The presidents of the society were:

- 1790 – Johann Jakob Kohlhaas
- 1811 – 1832 Francois Gabriel Graf von Bray
- 1840 – 1868 Carl Friedrich Philipp v. Martius

No-one took the role of president after 1868.

Chairs of the society have included:

- 1812 – 1846 David Heinrich Hoppe
- 1846 – 1861 August Emanuel Fürnrohr
- 1891 – 1900 Ottmar Hofmann
- 1900 – 1916 Heinrich Karl August Fürnrohr
- 1916 – 1956 Sebastian Killermann
- 1956 – 1974 Otto Mergenthaler
- 1974 – 1999 Andreas Bresinsky
- 2007 – 2024 Peter Poschlod
- 2024 – Hanno Schaefer – First Chairman of the Regensburgischen Botanischen Gesellschaft of 1790 e.V.
  - Josef Simmel – Second Chairman of the Regensburgischen Botanischen Gesellschaft of 1790 e.V.

Significant members of the society have included:

- Johann Wolfgang von Goethe
- Alexander von Humboldt
- Justus von Liebig
- Adelbert von Chamisso, botanist and poet
- Carl Wilhelm von Gümbel, geologist

Honorary membership of the society has been awarded to significant scientists including:

- Josef Poelt

The society had 516 members in 1841. Membership then declined gradually so that there were 89 in 1898 and only 40 by 1954. However, by the twenty-first century the society's membership had increased substantially to around 600.
