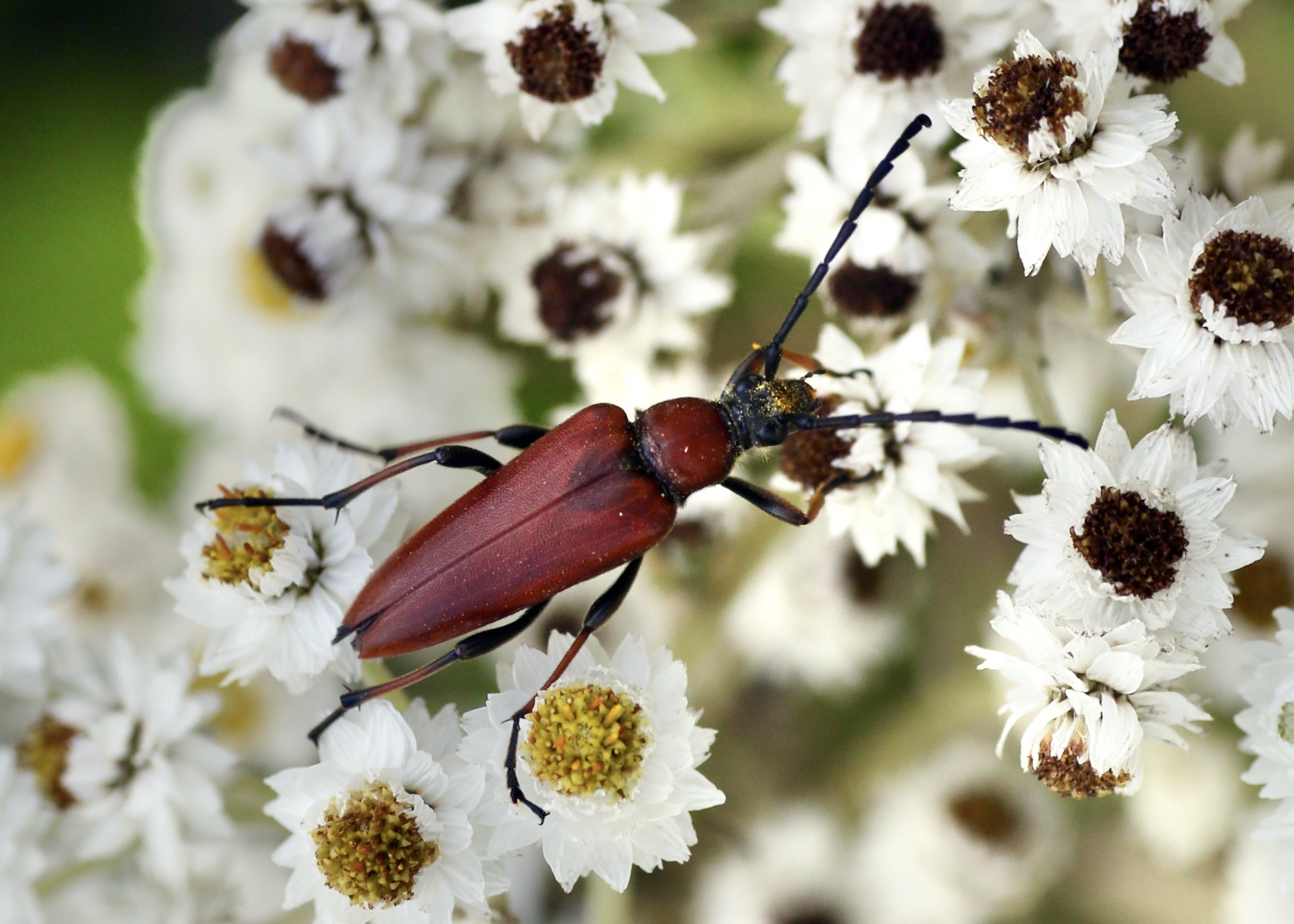

Scientific classification
- Domain: Eukaryota
- Kingdom: Animalia
- Phylum: Arthropoda
- Class: Insecta
- Order: Coleoptera
- Suborder: Polyphaga
- Infraorder: Cucujiformia
- Family: Cerambycidae
- Genus: Stictoleptura
- Species: S. dichroa

Binomial name
- Stictoleptura dichroa (Blanchard, 1871)

Synonyms
- Aredolpona dichroa (Blanchard) Nakane & Hayashi, 1957; Aredolpona succedanea (Lewis) Ohbayashi, Kurihara & Niisato, 2005; Leptura dichroa Blanchard, 1871; Leptura muliebris Heyden, 1886; Leptura rubra dichroa (Blanchard) Gressitt, 1951; Leptura succedanea Lewis, 1873; Stictoleptura rubra dichroa (Blanchard, 1871); Stictoleptura succedanea (Lewis, 1879)

= Stictoleptura dichroa =

Species of beetle

Stictoleptura dichroa is a species of beetle in the family Cerambycidae found in China, Korea and Russia.
