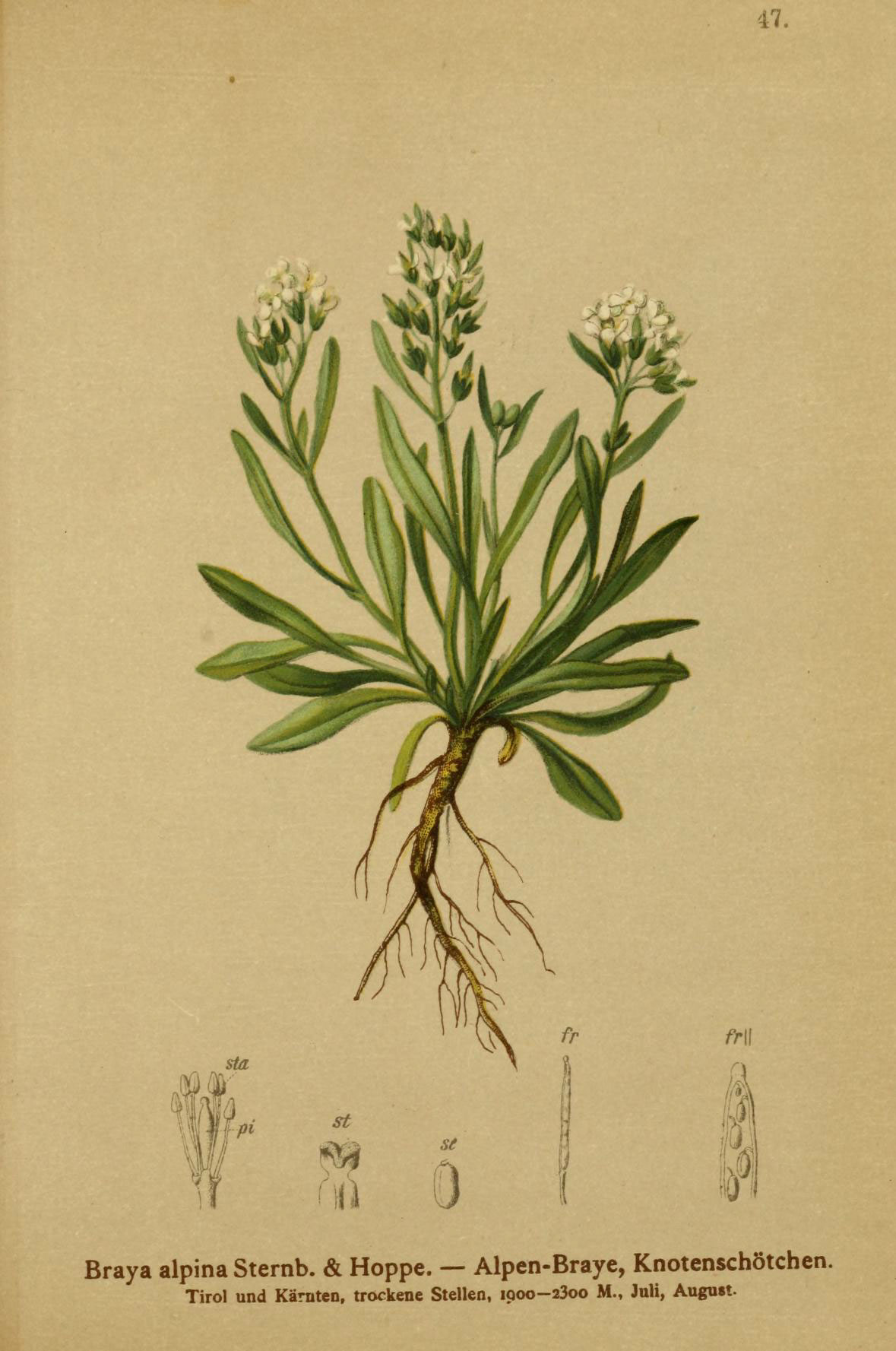
- Braya alpina

Scientific classification
- Kingdom: Plantae
- Clade: Tracheophytes
- Clade: Angiosperms
- Clade: Eudicots
- Clade: Rosids
- Order: Brassicales
- Family: Brassicaceae
- Genus: Braya; Sternb. & Hoppe

Synonyms
- Beketowia Krasn.; Platypetalum R.Br.

= Braya =

Genus of flowering plants

Braya is a genus of plants in the family Brassicaceae. It includes 22 species native to subarctic and subalpine Eurasia and North America.

== Species ==
22 species are accepted.

- Braya alpina Sternb. & Hoppe
- Braya fengii (Al-Shehbaz) Al-Shehbaz & D.A.German
- Braya fernaldii Abbe
- Braya gamosepala (Hedge) Al-Shehbaz & Warwick
- Braya glabella Richardson
- Braya humilis (C.A. Mey.) B.L.Rob.
- Braya linearis Rouy
- Braya longii Fernald
- Braya pamirica (H.Karst.) O.Fedtsch.
- Braya parvia (C.H.An) Al-Shehbaz & D.A.German
- Braya piasezkii (Maxim.) Al-Shehbaz & D.A.German
- Braya pilosa Hook.
- Braya purpurascens (R.Br.) Bunge ex Ledeb.
- Braya qingshuiheense (Y.Q.Ma & Zong Y.Zhu) Al-Shehbaz & D.A.German
- Braya rosea (Turcz.) Bunge
- Braya scharnhorstii Regel & Schmalh.
- Braya sichuanica Al-Shehbaz
- Braya siliquosa Bunge
- Braya stigmatosa (Franch.) Al-Shehbaz & D.A.German
- Braya thomsonii Hook.f.
- Braya thorild-wulffii Ostenf.
- Braya tibetica Hook.f. & Thomson
