= Jacob Johann Hagenbach =

Swiss entomologist

Jacob Johann Hagenbach (1802? in Basel – 1 January 1825) was a Swiss entomologist.

== Works ==
- Insectorum Helvetiae exhibientia vel species novas vel nondum depictas. Basileae, vol. 12, fasc. 1, 48 pp. + 15 pl.(1822)
- Insecta Coleoptrata, quae in itineribus suis, praesertim alpinis, collegerunt David Henricus Hoppe, Dr., et Fridericus Hornschuch, Dr., A. C. N. C. S. S. cum notis et descriptionibus Iacobi Sturm et Iacobi Hagenbach. Nova Acta Phys.Med. Acad. Caes. Leop.-Carol., 12 (2): 477-490, pl. XLV. (1825)
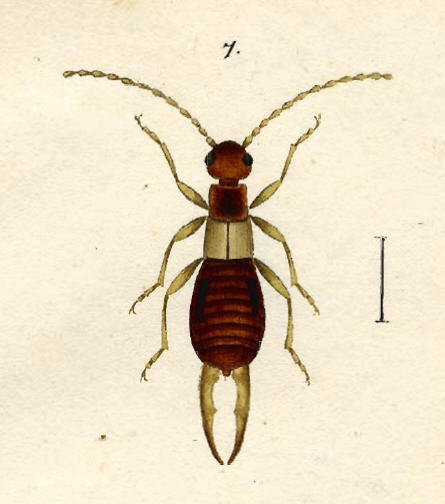

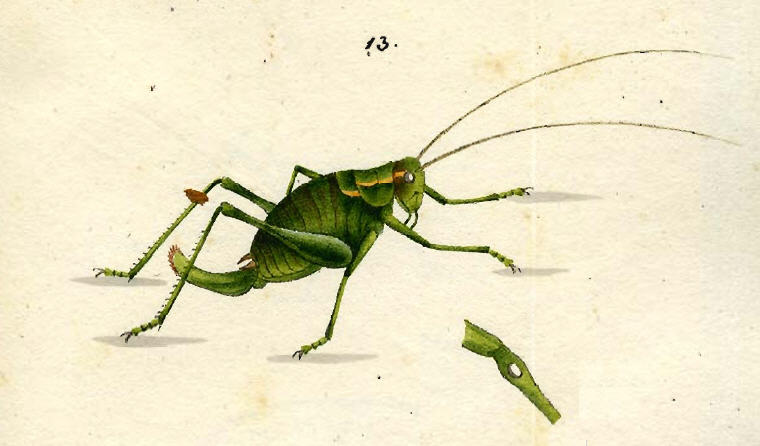

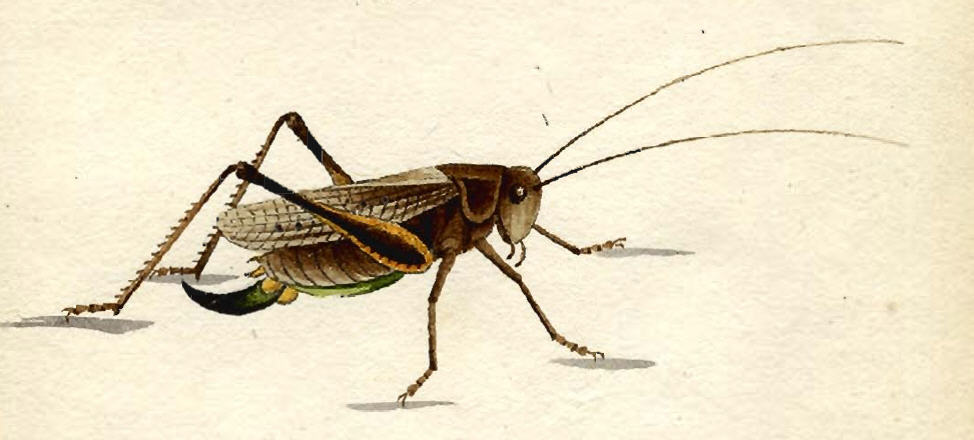

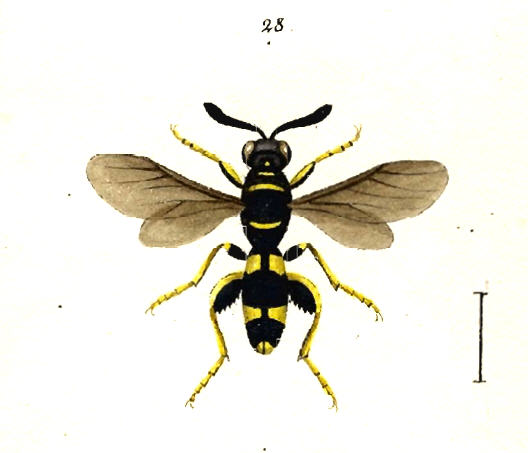
