= Committee on the Status of Endangered Wildlife in Canada =

Canadian wildlife conservation assessment committee

The Committee on the Status of Endangered Wildlife in Canada (COSEWIC, French: Comité sur la situation des espèces en péril au Canada, COSEPAC) is an independent committee of wildlife experts and scientists whose "raison d'être is to identify species at risk" in Canada. It designates the conservation status of wild species.

It was established in 1977 to provide a single, scientifically sound classification of wildlife species at risk of extinction. In the 2002 Species at Risk Act, COSEWIC was appointed as the body to identify and assess a species status. Although the status assigned by COSEWIC is not legally binding, it does report its results to the government and the public. The report is influential toward the addition of species to the List of Wildlife Species at Risk by the Minister of the Environment.

== Risk categories ==
All categories

By December 2013 there were "686 wildlife species in various COSEWIC risk categories, including 196 Special Concern (SC), 166 Threatened (T), 302 Endangered (E), 22 Extirpated (XT) (i.e., no longer found in the wild in Canada) and 15 wildlife species that are Extinct (X). The other category is not at risk (NAR).

COSEWIC provides online updated status reports on designated species.

== Criteria ==
COSEWIC bases its quantitative criteria for species' status assessment on the revised IUCN Red List, the world's most comprehensive inventory of the global conservation status of biological species. COSEWIC provides International Union for Conservation of Nature (IUCN), the world's main authority on the conservation status of species, with a Regional Red List.
