= List of fellows of the Engineering Institute of Canada =

This is a list of fellows of the Engineering Institute of Canada (EIC).

Year elected	Name †: deceased	Member society	Links
2002	Tyseer Aboulnasr	CSEM	EIC citation
2009	Barry James Adams	CSCE	EIC citation
1990	Peter Adams		
2000	Panajotis Agathoklis		
2014	Amir G. Aghdam	IEEE	EIC citation
2003	George Akhras		
1980	Murray Alary		
1977	George Aldworth		
1991	Paul-Émile Allard		
1974	Edgar Allcut		
2011	D. Grant Allen	CSChE	EIC citation
1980	Donald Allen		
2010	Michael Allen	CSCE	EIC citation
1987	Russell Allison		
2008	Cristina Amon	CSME	EIC citation
2002	Paul Amyotte	CSChE	EIC citation
2008	Inge Anderson	CDA	EIC citation
1980	Thian Soo Ang		
1978	John Angel		
1974	Donald Angus		
2003	Yahi Antar		
1971	Maurice Archer		
1980	Georges Archer		
1974	John Argo		
1989	Chris Arnold		
1973	Emilio Asistores		
2003	Michel Aubertin		
1971	Frank Ayers		
2011	William Baird	CSCE	EIC citation
1989	George Baker		
2006	Harry Baker		
1991	Baidar Bakht		
1980	Roman Baldur		
1994	Gérard Ballivy		
2000	John Bandlar		
2002	Amarjit Banwatt		
1978	Andrew Baracos		
2004	Lee Barbour		
1974	Stewart Barkwell		
1983	Clifford Baronet		
1967	Herbert Barratt		
1991	Barrington De V Batchelor		
1974	Leonard Bateman		
2001	Richard Bathurst		
1989	Gunther Bauer		
1980	Andrew Baxter		
1981	André Bazergui		
1985	Donald Bazett		
1980	Ira Beattie		
2007	Denis Beaulieu	CSCE	EIC citation
2001	Norman Beaulieu		
1996	Dennis Becker		
2002	Jean Bélanger		
1980	John Bell		
1970	Frank Bennett		
1991	Raymond Benson		
1989	Vijay Bhargava		
2002	Prakash Bhartia		
2004	Rama Bhat		
1981	Roy Billinton		
1980	André Biron		
1980	Cameron Blachford		
1983	James Black		
1995	Roger Blais †		
2008	Gregor Bochmann	IEEE	EIC citation
2010	Cathy Lynn Borbely	CSCE	EIC citation
1981	Jack Bordan		
1973	Lionel Boulet †		
1985	Joseph Bourbeau		
1980	Lloyd Boutilier		
1985	Keith Bowers		
1982	William Bowman		
1972	Robert Boyd		
2004	Fred Boyd		
1988	Michael Bozozuk		
1983	Frederick Bradshaw		
1989	George Brandys		
1980	Michael Brawn		
1998	Chuck Brawne		
1979	John Brison		
1989	Elmer Brooker		
1973	Edward Brown		
1988	Malcom Brown		
1991	John Brown		
1986	Angus Bruneau		
1974	John Bryce		
1974	Ronald Bryce		
1989	Lech Brzezinski		
1980	Thomas Brzustowski		
2004	Peter Buckland		
1979	Frederick Buckley		
1981	Arthur Budden		
1999	Daniel Burns		
1973	Lawrence Burpee		
1980	Pierre Bussières		
2009	Gerry Buydens	CSSE	EIC citation
2001	Peter Byrne		
1980	Clair Callaghan		
1994	Richard Campanella		
1975	Patrick Campbell		
1980	Colin K. Campbell		
1984	Colin H. Campbell		
1984	Wesley Campbell		
1976	Charles Campling		
1978	Stanley Carew		
1970	Jean-Paul Carrière		
1974	Clare Carruthers		
1986	William Carry		
1990	Peter Carson		
1991	J. Carson		
1979	Harry Carswell		
2010	Peter Castle	IEEE	EIC citation
1978	George Cater		
1973	Ross Chamberlain		
2009	Savvas Chamberlain	IEEE	EIC citation
1974	Harold A. Chambers		
1990	Thomas Chambers		
1971	Raymond Chant		
1993	Robert Chapuis		
2005	Atkinson Charles		
2005	Despins Charles		
2008	Michael Charles	CSChE	EIC citation
2009	Tongwen Chen	CSCE	EIC citation
1984	John Cherna		
2001	Leslie Cherwenuk		
1992	Roland Chevalier		
2008	Paul André Chiasson	CGS	EIC citation
2000	Aziz Chikhani		
1977	Jack Chisvin		
1993	Carl Christensen		
1997	Jacek Chrostowski		
1980	Jack Clark		
2000	Wayne Clifton		
2005	Shook Clifton		
1980	Orest Cochkanoff		
1985	Philip Cockshutt		
2009	Michael P. Collins	CSCE	EIC citation
1968	Hugh Conn		
1987	Alan Connelly		
1981	Cornelius Connolly		
1986	B. Cook		
1982	Norman Cooke		
2010	Francis M. Corbett	CSSE & IEEE	EIC citation
1982	Kenneth F. Coupland		
1987	Armand Couture		
1973	Kenneth Cox		
1980	James Cran		
1983	Carl Crawford		
2004	David Cruden		
2004	Ralph Crysler		
1977	Joseph Cunliffe		
2006	Michael Dacies		
1973	Camille Dagenais		
2011	Ajay K. Dalai	CSChE	EIC citation
2008	Darrel Danyluk	CSCE	EIC citation
2001	Oscar Dascal		
1987	Alan Davenport †		
1974	Arthur Davidson		
1971	William Dawson		
2004	M. Jamal Deen		
1974	Yvon Deguise		
1992	Gilles Delisle		
1983	Charles Demers		
1974	Ronald Denham		
1984	Rod A. Depaiva		
1996	Andrew Dery		
1993	Murty Devata		
1992	David Devenny		
1980	William Devereaux		
2007	Bruno Di Stefano	IEEE	EIC citation
1975	Colin Dicenzo		
1978	Ernest Dickinson		
2011	Walter Dilger	CSCE	EIC citation
1974	Richard Dillon		
1974	Paul Dilworth		
2001	Nikitas Dimopoulos		
2011	Ibrahim Dincer	CSME	EIC citation
1971	James Dineen		
1974	John Dinsmore		
1980	Jerrold Disher †		
1970	Harvey Doane		
	Octavia Dobre	IEEE	
2005	Mavinic Donald		
2004	Robert Donaldson		
1980	Roland Doré		
2005	Dorina Petriu		
1990	Roger Dorton		
1994	Sadik Dost		
1980	Allan Dove		
1970	Glenn Downing		
1980	Clifford Downing		
2001	Denzil Doyle		
1981	Warren Dubois		
2003	Eric Dubois		
1982	Earl Dudgeon		
1963	Robert Dunsmore		
1987	Yvon Dupuis		
1969	Ted Durnin		
1980	Rémy Dussault		
1999	Alv Dyregrov		
1988	Arthur Earle		
2010	Said Easa	CSCE	EIC citation
1990	George Eckenfelder		
1983	Henry Edamura		
1989	William Eden		
1992	Martin Eisenhauer		
2004	Andrew Eisenhauer		
1990	Zdenek Eisenstein		
1987	Dormer E. Ellis		
2008	Mohamed Elmasry	IEEE	EIC citation
1974	Roy Emery		
2006	Nabil Esmail		
2010	Ebrahim Esmailzadeh	CSME	EIC citation
1970	Arthur Evans		
1974	Eugenio Faludi		
1989	Waghi Fam		
2010	Liping Fang	IEEE & CSME	EIC citation
1985	David Farlinger		
1976	Adolph Feingold		
2002	Bengt Fellenius		
1980	Nelson Ferguson		
1999	Thomas Field		
1972	William H. Filer		
1996	Raymond Findlay		
1981	Ivan Finlay		
2011	Warren H. Finlay	CSME	EIC citation
1999	Liam Finn		
1974	Taylor Fisher		
1984	John Fisher		
1979	Raymond Fiske		
1963	Murray Fleming		
1980	Ronald Fleming		
2009	Jerzy M. Floryan	CSME	EIC citation
1974	Nicholas Fodor		
1980	Louis Fontaine		
1980	Rex Ford		
1981	George Ford		
1997	Thomas Walter Forest		
2003	Paul Fortier		
1974	John Foster		
1979	Thomas Foulkes		
1976	John Fox		
2009	Mark S. Fox	IEEE	EIC citation
1970	H. Frame		
1976	Douglas Fraser		
1979	Russell Fraser		
1993	Delwyn Fredlund		
1980	Marcel Frenette		
1985	Raymond Frigon		
1997	John Gadsby		
1973	Côté Gaétan		
2007	Henrietta L. Galiana	IEEE	EIC citation
1996	Vinod Garga		
1975	Eric Garland		
2000	Raymond Garneau		
1994	John Gartner		
1984	William Gates		
1964	Henri Gaudefroy		
1988	Robert Généreux		
1994	Nicolas Georganas		
2004	Amin Ghali		
2009	Fadhel Ghannouchi	IEEE	EIC citation
1991	Denis Gill		
1993	Patrick Gillin		
1975	Yves Giroux		
1993	Kathleen Gissing		
1978	Edward Glass		
1980	Peter Glockner		
1985	Lorne Gold		
2010	Andrew Goldenberg	IEEE	EIC citation
1975	Ronald Gooderham		
2007	Guy Gosselin	CSCE	EIC citation
1995	James Chalmers Gordon		
1978	Ray Gosine		
1979	Murray Gould		
1968	George Govier		
2004	John Ross Grace		
1990	James Graham		
2005	Creedy Graham		
1981	Gerhardt Granek		
1978	Ian Gray		
1995	Malcolm Gray		
2003	Murray Gray		
1974	Donald Gray-Donald		
2007	John Grefford	IEEE	EIC citation
1973	Arnold Groleau		
2002	Wayne Grover		
2007	William A. Gruver	IEEE	EIC citation
2009	Ling Guan	IEEE	EIC citation
2002	Aaron Guliver		
2006	Ralph Haas		
2004	David Haccoun		
1973	Jack Hahn		
1987	Robert Halsall		
1987	Sydney Halter		
1977	James Ham		
1974	Mervyn Hambley		
2006	Robert Hanna		
1984	John Harbert		
1965	Robert Hardy		
1974	William Harland		
1982	Leslie Harmsworth		
1992	André Harvie		
1970	Russell Harrington		
1984	Philip Harris		
1990	Murray Harris		
1978	Peter Hart		
1974	Eric Hartley		
1996	Francis Hartman		
2001	James Haslett		
1984	Mohamed E. El-Hawary		
1997	Ferial El-Hawary		
1973	Elbert Hayes		
2002	Don Hayley		
2002	John Hazlett		
1964	Richard Heartz		
1976	Joseph Heffernan		
1978	Gordon Henderson		
1981	John Henderson		
1992	Jens Henriksen		
2003	Glynn Henry		
1974	Charles Hershfield †		
1978	Gordon Herzog		
1970	Boris Heskett		
1974	Winston Hickey		
1980	Clinton Higginson		
1970	Richard Hiscocks		
2007	Suong Van Hoa	CSME	EIC citation
1975	John Hodgins		
2004	Terrence William Hoffman		
1980	George Hoganson		
1974	Allan Hogg		
1970	George Holbrook		
1984	Frank Holden		
1974	Russell Hood		
1975	John Hoogstraten		
1981	Frank Hooper		
1999	Mel Hosain		
1998	Jules Houd		
1966	Len Hovey		
1983	Albert Howard		
1986	Norman Howard		
2006	John Howard		
1996	Lawrence Howe		
1974	Mark Huggins		
2005	Mcqueen Hugh		
1981	Gwilym J. Hughes		
1993	Jagmohan Humar		
1974	George Humphries		
1966	Brewer Hunt		
1973	Jacques Hurtubise		
2005	Mouftah Hussain		
1989	James Hutch		
1969	Neil Hutcheon		
1970	Leslie Hutchison		
2005	Alan S. Imrie		
2006	David Innes		
1980	Gordon Inns		
2001	Alan Insley		
1999	Michael Ircha		
1999	Michael Isaacson		
1990	John Izard		
1994	Hector Jacques		
1984	Leslie Jaeger		
2006	Praveen Jain		
1975	Jean Côté		
2003	Norman Jeffrey		
2007	John H. F. Jennekens	CSSE	EIC citation
2006	Jack Jesweit		
2005	Khran John		
2005	Lodge John		
1986	Norman Johnson		
1993	Claude Johnson		
1996	Len Johnson		
1989	Henry Johnston		
1974	Llewellyn Jones		
2007	Géza Joós	IEEE	EIC citation
1974	Eric A. Jorgensen		
1983	Robert Joss		
2007	Graham A. Julien	IEEE	
2000	Peter Kaiser		
2007	Mohamed S. Kamel	IEEE	EIC citation
1976	Josef Kates		
2014	Leon Katz	CMBES/SCGB	EIC citation
2000	Robert Kearney	CMBES/SCGB	
2005	Hipel Keith		
1986	H William M. Kelly		
1998	Dave Kem		
1974	Laurie Kennedy		
1998	William Kennedy		
1980	Cameron Kenney		
1978	Byron Kerr		
1979	James Kerr		
1987	Norman Kerr		
1999	Wallas Khella		
1975	Vernon King		
1973	Grange Kingsmill		
1991	John James Kinley		
2006	Witold Kinsner		
1970	Lesmere Kirkpatrick		
1980	Hans Kivisild		
1984	Douglas Kline		
1988	Earle Klohn		
2003	Jean-Marie Konrad		
2006	Robert Korol		
2007	Don Orest Koval	IEEE	EIC citation
2000	Witold Krzymien		
2006	Frank Kschischang		
1999	Chandra Kudsia		
1998	Suzanne Lacasse		
1979	Branko Ladanyi		
1980	John Laffin		
1983	Jean-Marc Lagacé		
1994	Jim Laing		
1980	Claude Lajeunesse		
1973	Bernard Lamarre		
1997	Arvid Landva		
1991	Donald Laplante		
1974	Pierre Larochelle		
1966	Stanley Lash		
1980	Jacques Lavigne		
1987	Bernard Lavigueur		
1995	Tim Law		
1968	Frederic Lawton		
1983	Tronson J. Leach		
1999	Peter Leach		
1980	Brian G. Lechem		
1991	Michel Lecours		
1998	Chack Fan Lee		
1998	Guy Lefebvre		
1965	Robert Legget †		
1980	Horst E. Leipholz		
1977	Martha Leitch		
1980	Clément Lemyre		
2000	Cyril Edel Leonoff		
1999	Serge Leroueil		
1980	Ralph Lewis		
1999	Ivan Lieszkowszky		
1977	Walter Light		
1980	Harold Lilly		
1984	James Lindsay		
1988	Gordon Lindsay		
1988	Samuel Lipson		
1992	Kwan-Yee Lo		
1997	Jacques Locat		
1980	Gerald H. Lock		
1988	Gary Locker		
2001	Robert Loov		
1980	Denis Loranger		
1976	Ross Lord		
1994	Ian G. Lowe		
1994	Wu-Sheng Lu		
2003	Benjamin Lu		
2000	Boro Lukajic		
2002	David Thomas Lynch		
1980	Donald Maccallum		
1973	Donald Macdonald		
1977	Francis Macdonald		
2004	Ralston MacDonnell		
1972	Elsie Gregory Macgill		
1975	Cameron Macinnis		
1974	William Mackay		
1977	William F. Mackay		
1972	Harold Macklin		
1974	James Maclaren		
1984	Mohan Malhotra		
2001	Om P Malik		
1990	Eric Manning		
1970	John Mantle		
1974	Arthur Margison		
1971	Gerald Martin		
2006	Derek Martin		
2005	Farzanah Masoud		
1987	Robert Masse		
1980	Michel Massièra		
1980	Mounir Massoud		
1992	A. J. Matich		
2001	Robert Matyas		
1974	Murray Maynard		
2002	Alex Mccorquodale		
2001	Dougal Mccreath		
1980	William Mcdill		
1983	Howard Mcfarlane		
1987	Lloyd Mcginnis		
1984	William Mcintosh		
1970	Donald R. Mckinley		
1981	Francis Mcmulkin		
1963	Andrew F. Mcqueen		
2001	Ed Mcroberts		
1988	Gordon Mcrostie		
1974	George Meagher		
1989	William Meredith		
1972	Geoffrey Meyerhof		
1983	Bernard Michel		
1989	Victor Milligan		
1988	John Milne		
1984	Saeed Mirza		
2002	Ali Mirza		
1993	Robert Mitchell		
2004	Denis Mitchell		
1981	John Mohamed		
2000	Mo Mohitpour		
1984	Matt Mohtadi		
2002	Jack Mollard		
1977	Patrick Monaghan		
1995	Guy Monty		
1976	Kenneth Moore		
1980	Donald Moore		
2002	Ian Moore		
2006	Dennis Moore		
1966	Donald Mordell		
1985	Nordie Morgenstern		
1980	Jean-Paul Morin		
1974	Carson Morrison †		
1984	Douglas Morrison		
2007	Kenneth A. Morrison	CSCE	EIC citation
1977	James Moull		
1980	Nes Mudry		
1985	Aftab Mufti		
1978	Dinkar Mukhedkar		
2005	Saatcioglu Murat		
1980	Charles Murdoch		
1982	Henry M. Murray		
1978	Léopold Nadeau		
1982	Hugh Naismith		
2007	Kumar Nandakumar	CSChE	EIC citation
1972	Barrington Nevitt		
1980	Roy Newcombe		
2000	Tho Ngoc		
2001	Roger Nicolet		
1980	Peter Nikiforuk		
2003	Derick Nixon		
1979	George Nyke		
1987	John Oliver		
2002	Guy Olivier		
2001	Michael O’Connor		
1989	Frank O'Neil		
1977	Theodore O'Neill		
1990	Harold J. Page		
1993	Laverne H. Palmer		
1981	Stanley Pappius		
1991	Jacques Paré		
1980	Anthony Parfitt		
2007	Chul Park	CSME	EIC citation
1974	Gordon Parr		
1978	Rex Parsons		
1992	Ron Parsons		
2004	Subbarayan Pasupathy		
1974	Walter Paterson		
2005	Fazio Paul		
1976	Tomas F. Pavlasek		
1970	Cyril Peachey		
1994	Kenneth Rudyard Peaker		
1984	Lionel Peckover		
1988	Frank N. Penner		
2000	Alan Perks		
1981	Gilles Perron		
2005	Lighthall Peter		
2000	Emil Petriu		
2006	Ryan Phillips		
2003	Samuel Pierre		
1971	Guillaume Piette		
1990	John Plant		
2004	Kenneth Porteous		
1996	Louis Poulin		
2007	Edward G. Price	CNS	EIC citation
1976	Jack Priestman		
1982	George Prince		
1974	Edward Proctor		
1975	Zdislaw Przygoda		
1997	Dennis Pufahl		
1981	Kalju Pullerits		
1992	Kenneth Putt		
1991	Robert Quigley		
1972	Richard Quittenton		
1998	Azizur Rahman		
2005	Patel Rajni		
1987	V. Ramachandran		
2002	Rangaraj M. Rangayyan		
1992	Gerald Raymond		
2006	Ghani Razaqpur		
1978	Wallace Read		
1974	Donald Redfern		
1998	David Reid		
1987	Stephen Revay		
1976	William Rice		
1981	William Riley		
1980	Friedrich P. J. Rimrott †		
1991	Spruce Riordon		
1982	Charles Ripley		
1979	Christopher Ritchie		
1995	Sami Rizkalla		
2005	Alden Robert		
2000	Peter Robertson		
1980	Terry Rogers		
1991	Lucien Rolland		
2000	André Rollin		
2003	Marc Rosen		
1980	Philip Ross-Ross		
1984	Henry Rounsefell		
1993	R. Kerry Rowe		
1973	Léo Roy		
1981	Jacques Roy		
2001	Marius Roy		
1974	Karel Rybka		
1995	Mohindar Sachdev		
2007	C. Andre T. Salama	IEEE	EIC citation
1984	John Samson		
1988	Laval Samson		
1978	Kevin St. George		
1977	Adrian Sanderson		
1982	Thiagas Sankar		
1988	Karl Sauer		
1974	Murray Schmitt		
1986	Eric Scott		
1981	Philip Seabrook		
1974	Lloyd Secord		
1996	David Sego		
1974	Harvey Self		
1990	Patrick Selvadurai		
1974	Lawrence Sentance		
1980	Kenneth Serdula		
1974	Robert Service		
1993	Rangaswamy Seshadri		
1978	Jack Sexton		
1990	John Seychuk		
1974	Paul Shane		
1994	James Sharp		
1974	Robert Shaw		
1982	Donald Shaw		
1981	Joseph Sheinin		
1980	Leslie Shemilt		
1977	Donald Shields		
2007	Tarlochan S. Sidhu	IEEE	EIC citation
1970	Sydney Sillitoe		
2002	Margaret C. Simons		
1974	George Sinclair		
2004	Adam Skorek		
1980	Gordon Slemon		
1971	Owen Smith		
1979	Claude M. Smith		
1986	Clifford Smith		
1990	Peter Smith		
2001	Daniel Smith		
2002	Alan Smith		
1999	Vijay Sood		
1985	Jacques Soucy		
1974	Charles Southmayd		
1999	Victor Sowa		
2003	John Springfield		
1980	Robert Sproule		
2007	N. K. Srivastava	CSCE	EIC citation
1971	Allison Steeves		
1978	Richard Steketee		
1988	Anthony Stermac		
1984	Herbert Stevenson		
1976	John Stirling		
1983	Fred Stock		
1996	Euan Strachan		
2005	Das Sunil		
2006	William Svrcek		
1981	N.W. Swamy		
1980	Robert Swartman		
1984	John Sweeney		
1975	John Swerdfeger		
1980	Behrouz Tabarrok		
1980	Gordon Tallman		
1970	Robert Tanner		
1980	Roy Tanton		
1991	François Tavenas †		
2004	Stavros Tavoularis		
2004	Anthony Tawil		
1973	Morley Taylor		
1981	Desmond Taylor		
2003	Donald Taylor		
1980	Murray Temple		
1978	Carson Templeton		
1978	David Templeton		
1973	Franklyn Theakston		
1978	Douglas Thierman		
1999	Gordon Thomson		
2003	Gordon Thomson		
1970	Stanley Thurgar		
1970	Andrew Timascheff		
1981	Allan Torvi		
2007	Jean-Pierre Tournier	CGS	EIC citation
1977	David Townsend		
2000	Ronald Townsend		
1983	Jacques Tremblay		
2003	Frederick Trofimenkoff		
1992	A. Trow		
1981	Albert Tuck		
2001	Hilmi Turanli		
1980	Fred Turner		
1983	William M. Turner		
1984	Rod Tweddle		
1983	Reginald Tweeddale		
2003	Yoginde Vaid		
1998	Arun Valsangkar		
2006	Douglas Van Dine		
1982	Henry Vandernoot		
1986	Alan Vandusen		
1981	Pieter Vanvliet		
1987	Philip Vaughan		
1984	Wim Veldman		
1998	Maja Veljkovic		
1980	A.N. Venetsanopoulos		
1978	Frederic Vivian		
1980	Cornelius Vogel		
1983	Herbert Voneichen		
1984	Michael Ward		
1998	Rabab Kreidieh Ward		
1974	Leslie Wardrop		
1997	Bryan Watts		
2000	David Weaver		
1987	Martin Wedepohl		
2001	Ronald Weir		
1984	Gordon Weld		
1987	James Weller		
1980	George Wheatley		
1971	Waldo Wheten		
1980	Owen White		
2003	Lorne White		
2005	Wright Whitman		
1970	Carl Whittemore		
1977	Max Wideman		
1997	Adrian Wightman		
1980	Ernest Wilkins		
2006	David Wilkinson		
1971	Gerald Williams		
1970	Donald Wilson		
1977	Murray Wilson		
1980	Andrew Wilson		
1981	Nyal Wilson		
1984	Peter Wilson		
2002	Frank Wilson		
1980	Reginald Bing Wo		
1983	Daniel Worobec		
1974	Douglas Wright		
1977	Peter Wright		
1996	Peter Wu		
1977	Morden Yolles		
1988	Raymond Yong		
1984	Peter Yurkiw		
2006	Jean Zu		
1980	Ernest Zucker		
2009	Desmond Hartford	CDA	EIC citation
2011	Arthur Heiderbrecht	CSCE	EIC citation
2011	Robert D. Hooton	CSCE	EIC citation
2008	Oldrich Hungr	CGS	EIC citation
2011	D. Jean Hutchinson	CGS	EIC citation
2009	Peter A. Irwin	CSCE	EIC citation
2011	André Ivanov	IEEE	EIC citation
2011	Terrance J. Jamieson	CNS	EIC citation
2010	Digvir S. Jayas	CSB	EIC citation
2011	Jin Jiang	IEEE	EIC citation
2008	Safa Kasap	IEEE	EIC citation
2011	Raman Kashyap	IEEE	EIC citation
2008	Alberto Leon-Garcia	IEEE	EIC citation
2009	Victor Leung	IEEE	EIC citation
2010	Wenyuan Li	IEEE	EIC citation
2008	Xianguo Li	CSME	EIC citation
2009	Maike Luiken	IEEE	EIC citation
2010	Albert F. Lukey	CSCE	EIC citation
2008	Alistair Mackenzie	CSCE	EIC citation
2009	Xavier Maldague	IEEE	EIC citation
2008	Rafaat Mansour	IEEE	EIC citation
2011	Edward A. McBean	CSCE	EIC citation
2011	Shaker Meguid	CSME	EIC citation
2011	Graham C. Morgan	CSSE	EIC citation
2010	Javad Mostaghami	CSME	
2010	Gregory F. Naterer	CSME	EIC citation
2008	Patrick Oosthuizend	CSME	
2008	Witold Pedryz	IEEE	EIC citation
2009	David Plant	IEEE	EIC citation
2010	Kostantinos Plataniotis	IEEE	EIC citation
2009	Nimal Rajapakse	CSCE	EIC citation
2010	Douglas W. Ruth	CSME	EIC citation
2010	El Saddick	IEEE	EIC citation
2008	Gary Salmon	CDA	EIC citation
2011	Wayne Savigny	CGS	EIC citation
2008	Mohamad Sawan	IEEE	EIC citation
2010	John Donald Scott	CGS	EIC citation
2010	Larry E. Seeley	CNS	EIC citation
2008	Paresh Sen	IEEE	EIC citation
2009	Lotfollah Shafai	IEEE	EIC citation
2011	Xuemin (Sherman) Shen	IEEE	EIC citation
2008	Gregory Stone	IEEE	EIC citation
2010	Gerard Verzeni	CDA	EIC citation
2009	James S. Wallace	CSME	EIC citation
2010	Eric Lyn Williams	CNS	EIC citation
2008	Bin Wu	IEEE	EIC citation
2009	Wilsun Xu	IEEE	EIC citation
2009	Jesse Zhu	CSChE	EIC citation
2011	Shiping Zhu	CSChE	EIC citation
2011	P. Andrew Zielinski	CDA	EIC citation
