= Girouard =

Girouard may refer to:

== People ==
- Antoine Girouard (politician) (1836–1904), Canadian political figure
- Audrey Girouard, Canadian computer scientist and professor
- Lady Blanche Girouard, Irish writer
- Désiré Girouard (1836–1911), Canadian lawyer, politician, and Puisne Justice of the Supreme Court of Canada
- Gérard Girouard (born 1933) Canadian lawyer, professor and politician
- Gilbert Anselme Girouard (1846–1885), Canadian general merchant and political figure
- Jean-Joseph Girouard (1794–1855), Canadian notary and political figure
- Joseph-Éna Girouard (1855–1937), Canadian notary, lawyer and political figure
- Mark Girouard (1931–2022), British architectural writer and historian
- Marvin Girouard, American businessman
- Paul J. Girouard (1898–1964) American-born Catholic bishop in Madagascar
- Percy Girouard (1867–1932), Canadian railway builder and colonial governor
- Wilfrid Girouard (1891–1980), Canadian lawyer, judge and political figure
- Yvette Girouard, American softball coach

== Places ==
- Le Girouard, a commune in the Vendée department in Western France
- Mount Girouard, the highest peak of the Fairholme Range in Banff National Park, Canada
- Girouard Lake, on the Mégiscane River, in Senneterre, Quebec, Canada

== See also ==
- Girouard v. United States, a case decided by the Supreme Court of the United States
- Collège Antoine-Girouard, a high school in Quebec
