= Charles Hershfield =

Canadian engineer (1910–1990)

- Born: December 24, 1910; Winnipeg, Manitoba Canada
- Died: March 11, 1990 (aged 79); Toronto, Ontario Canada
- Education: B.Sc., Civil Engineering, University of Manitoba 1930 M.Sc. Civil Engineering, University of Toronto 1950
- Spouse: Janet Hershfield
- Engineering career
- Practice name: Morrison Hershfield
- Projects: Stratford Shakespearean Festival Theatre, assisted with complex roof design, 1957. Ontario Pavilion Building at Expo 67, designed complex roofing system, 1967.
- Awards: Elected into the Engineering Institute of Canada Fellows (F.E.I.C), 1974. Association of Professional Engineers Ontario, Engineering Medal, 1982.

Charles Hershfield, B.Sc., M.A.Sc, F.E.I.C, P.Eng. (1910–1990) was a Canadian engineer who was widely recognized by the engineering community and known for his innovative structural engineering solutions, as a senior assistant engineer and lieutenant with the Department of National Defense, a professor at the University of Toronto, as co-founder of the North American firm Morrison Hershfield, and as a prolific author. He was a lifelong advocate of education and the engineering profession.

== Early life and education ==
Hershfield' parents Aaron and Molly Hershfield left Teofipol, Ukraine in the mid-1890s for Manitoba, Canada in search of greater opportunities and in the hopes of starting a family. On December 24, 1910, their son Charles Hershfield was born. As a child and later in his teens, Hershfield's interests resided in music, baseball, carpentry, and mechanical engineering. He attended St. John's High School in Winnipeg, Manitoba, and even from a young age, highly valued his education.

Hershfield later studied engineering at the University of Manitoba. Working with two of his classmates, H.F. Peters and W. Gruber, Hershfield submitted the thesis "Some Tests of Welded Joints". Hershfield graduated in 1930 with the degree of Bachelor of Science in civil engineering.

During the summer periods as an undergraduate Hershfield worked for the Dominion Bridge Company in Winnipeg. Upon graduation and until 1932, in conjunction with the Winnipeg City Engineer, he was involved with structural design of bridges, viaducts and subways.

Several years later Hershfield continued his education and received the degree of Master of Applied Science from the University of Toronto in 1950. His master's thesis was titled "Series Expansion of Joint Rotations for the Analysis of Rigidly Framed Structures ".

== Working life ==
In 1935 Hershfield moved to Toronto, Ontario and until 1941 was employed with Standard Iron and Steel Works where his skills and services were focused in structural design, estimating, contracting, detailing and supervision of the fabrication and erection of steel structures.

From 1941 to 1943 he was a staff member of the Canadian Department of National Defense, Naval Service, Works and Building Branch as Senior Assistant Engineer, with the rank of Lieutenant. His work during this time included structural design on naval shore establishments including shops, storage facilities, training buildings, and drill halls, of wide variety as to size and materials of construction.

After leaving the naval service in 1943, Hershfield joined the staff of the Department of Civil Engineering at the University of Toronto. Hershfield taught a variety of courses related to structural engineering and supervised many graduate students. He was also principal instructor in structural engineering in the School of Architecture at University of Toronto.

In 1946 Hershfield, along with Carson Morrison, Joe Millman, and Mark Huggins, responded to the post-war building boom by founding the engineering consulting firm Morrison Hershfield Millman and Huggins. The firm today exists under the name Morrison Hershfield, with offices across North America specializing in multidisciplinary engineering and related expertise.

Hershfield retired from teaching at the University of Toronto in 1976 after 31 years of service but continued to work closely with Morrison Hershfield almost up to the time of his death.

== Notable projects ==
- Assisted with complex structural design of the roof for the Stratford Shakespeare Festival Theatre, Stratford, Ontario (1957)
- Designed the complex structural roofing system for the Ontario Pavilion Building at Expo 67, Montreal, Quebec (1967)
- Assisted with the expansion of the Toronto Mount Sinai Hospital, Toronto, Ontario
- University of Toronto Medical Science Building, Toronto, Ontario

== Awards and achievements ==
- Elected to the grade of Partner with the Engineering Institute of Canada, 1955.
- Member of the Publications Committee, for the Engineering Journal, 1970–74.
- Elected to Fellow of the Engineering Institute of Canada, 1974.
- Consulting Engineer Designation, Association of Professional Engineers, 1974.
- Member of the Committee of Examiners, Ontario Association of Architects, 1974–82
- Member of the Canadian Standards Association Standards Policy Board, 1977–78.
- Requalified as a Designated Consulting Engineer, Association of Professional Engineers, 1979.
- Awarded the Engineering Medal by the Association of Professional Engineers Ontario, 1982.
- Served as a Structural Engineer on the OAA Committee of Examiners, 1982.
- Upon his death, the University of Toronto set up the Charles Hershfield Memorial Scholarship fund to acknowledge Hershfield's significant accomplishments as a structural engineer and professor. This scholarship is given to outstanding graduate students in structural engineering, established in 1990.

== Technical papers ==
- Roof Structure of New Theatre for Stratford Shakespearean Festival: a proposal on the Stratford Shakespearean Festival Theatre roof based on analytical methods and techniques used, 1956–1957.
- One Cycle Moment Distribution for Structural Analysis: Presented in a meeting to the Engineering Institute of Canada, 1959.
- Exploiting the Structural Potentials of Woven Fabrics: A paper regarding an increase in the variety of woven fabrics available and a corresponding increase in the possibilities of using them to great advantage to form parts or all of the structure for certain types of buildings, 1967.
- Civil Engineering Education in Canada, Present and Future: Written with colleague G.W. Heinke at the University of Toronto and also a member of the Engineering Institute of Canada. This paper reviews a study taken place in 1968, looking at the opinions of all U of T department staff, present and former students, practising engineers from industry and government, as well as staff and administrators from a variety of technological institutes, Paper presented at the 83rd Annual Meeting of the Engineering Institute of Canada, Vancouver, September 1969. Published in the Engineering Journal in January 1970.

== See also ==
- Carson Morrison
- Morrison Hershfield
