= Andrew Baxter =

Andrew Baxter may refer to:

- Andrew Baxter (metaphysician) (c. 1686–1750), Scottish metaphysician
- Andrew Baxter (1869–1955), African-American fiddle player, see Andrew and Jim Baxter
- Andrew Baxter (politician), member of the Scottish parliament
- Andrew Baxter, Canadian engineer, see List of Fellows of the Engineering Institute of Canada
- Dr. Andrew Baxter, character in The Young Doctors

== See also ==
- Robert Andrew Baxter (1879–1947), Canadian politician
