= Csit =

CSIT may refer to:

== Education ==
- Carleton School of Information Technology
- Chhatrapati Shivaji Institute of Technology

== Cyber Security ==
- The Centre for Secure Information Technologies (CSIT)

== Computing ==
- Computer Science Information Technology

== Other uses ==
- Channel state information at the transmitter, wireless communication term
- Coral Sea Islands Territory, an external territory of Australia
- CSIT - International Workers and Amateurs in Sports Confederation (French: Comité Sportif International du Travail)
