= Aberdeen Avenue =

Lower City minor arterial road in Hamilton, Ontario, Canada

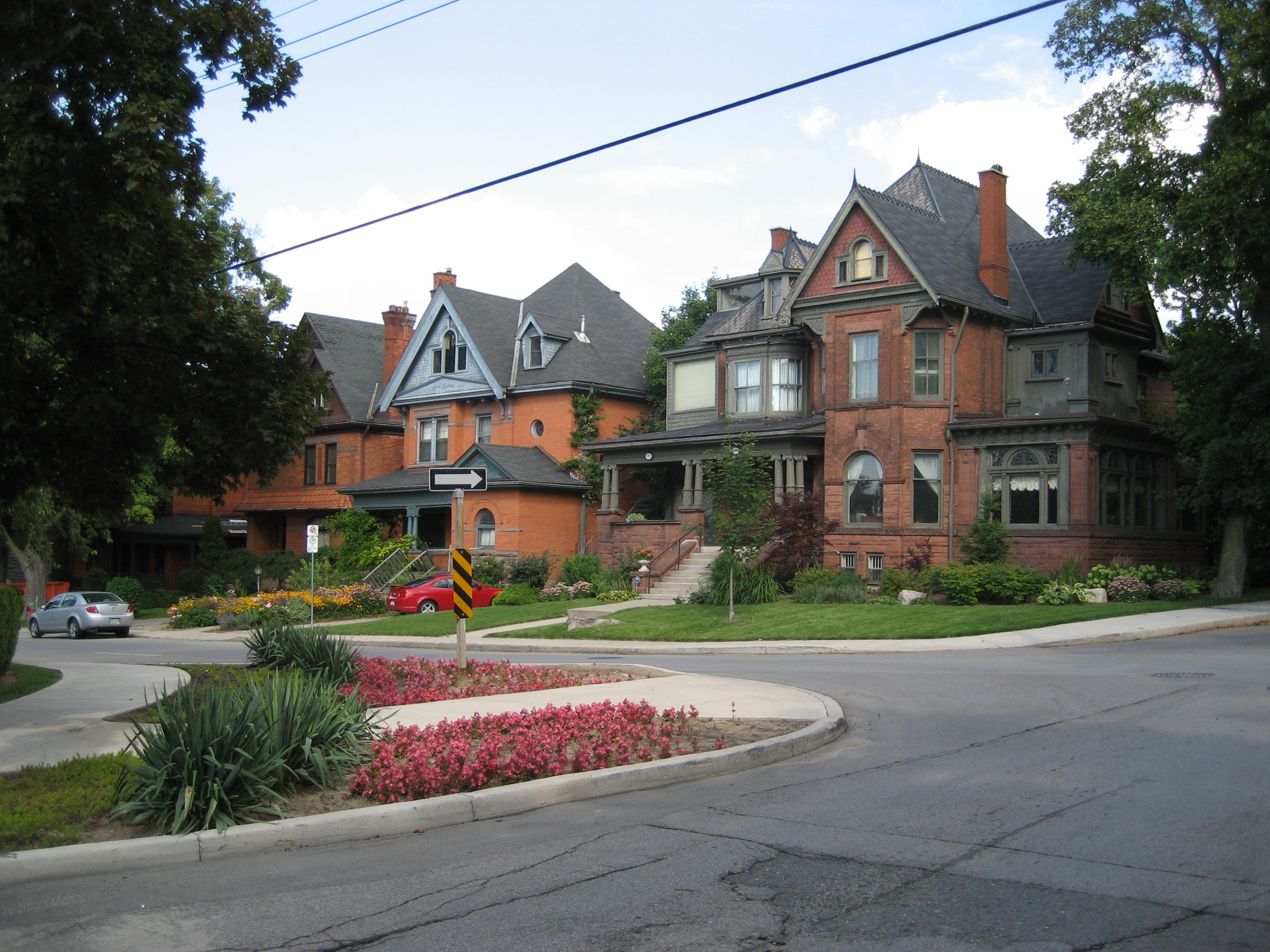
Aberdeen Avenue, near Bay Street South

Aberdeen Avenue is a Lower City minor arterial road in Hamilton, Ontario, Canada. It starts off just west of Longwood Road South and east of Highway 403 as a two-way thoroughfare up to Queen Street South, where it then switches over to a one-way collector road (eastbound) to Bay Street South and then to another two-way section from Bay Street to James Mountain Road, a mountain-access road in the city near the base of the Niagara Escarpment (mountain).

== History ==
Aberdeen Avenue was named after Lord Aberdeen (John Hamilton-Gordon, 1st Marquess of Aberdeen and Temair) and Lady Aberdeen (Ishbel Hamilton-Gordon, Marchioness of Aberdeen and Temair) who both lived in Hamilton on Bay Street South (1890-1898) with their four children. They presided over the opening of the Hamilton Public Library on September 16, 1890. Lord Aberdeen was appointed Governor General of Canada in 1893.

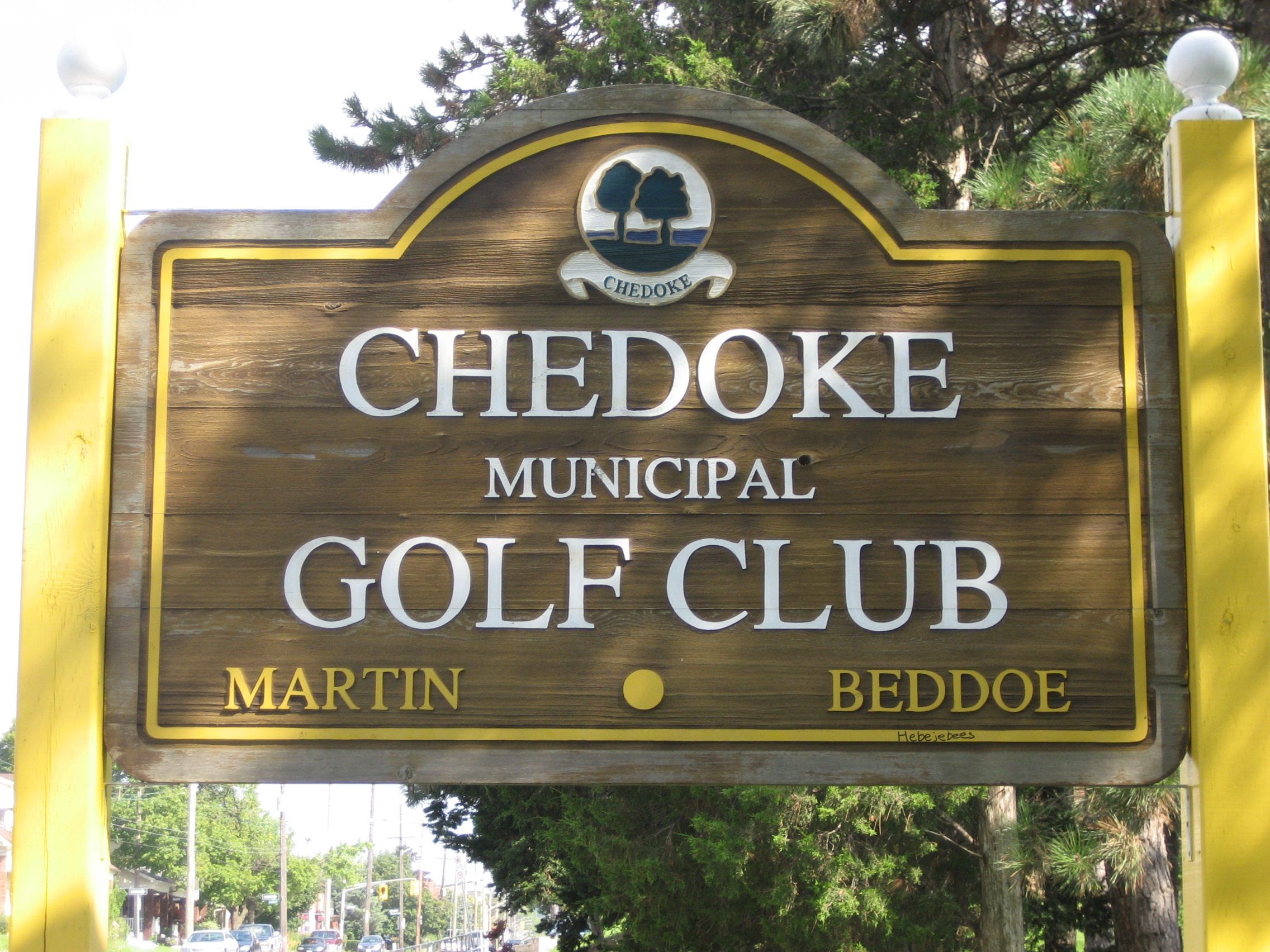

Historically, the Durand neighbourhood along Markland Street and Aberdeen Avenue, east of Queen Street, was home to the 'industrialists'. This south of downtown neighbourhood is quite possibly the largest concentration of early 20th-century castles/mansions in Canada. The grand homes were home to the families whose names graced the signs of the north end factories and made their fortunes in transportation, finance and industry.

A McMaster University research campus called McMaster Innovation Park is currently being developed on the former Camco lands near Westdale. This will be an "idea factory" employing scientists and technicians. CANMET will employ 100 research scientists and support workers, including some of the top minds in Canada and will be the anchor tenant of the facility. They will be working closely with McMaster researchers and private industry to develop technologies for metal and materials manufacturing, processing and evaluation. Expected to be up-and-running by 2010. Other tenants already announced for the park include a corrosion research centre sponsored by General Motors and a diesel engine research lab sponsored by Ford.

== Landmarks ==
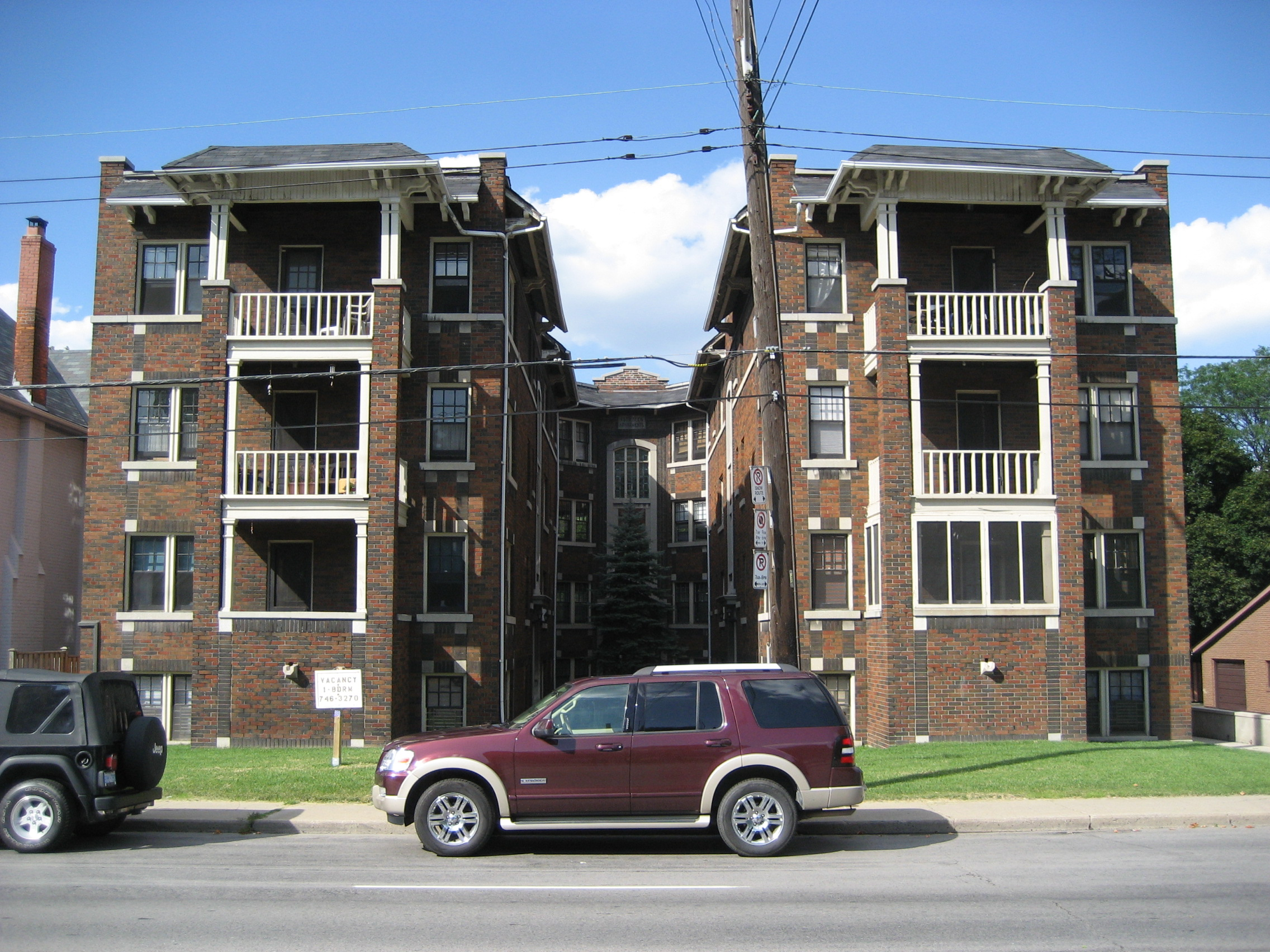
Aberdeen Apartments

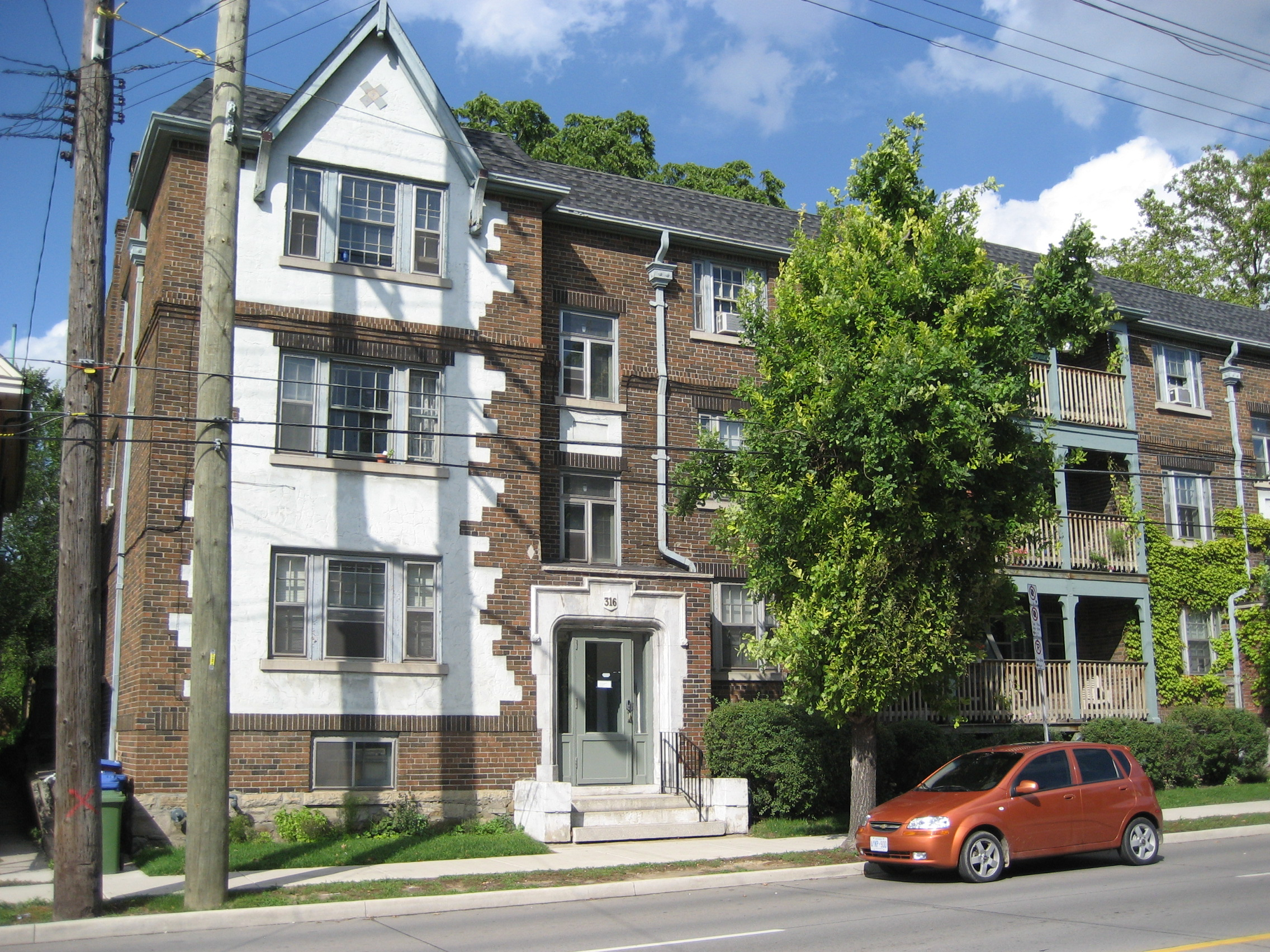
Aberdeen Avenue

Note: listing of landmarks from west to east.

- Highway 403, (Chedoke Expressway)
- McMaster Innovation Park, former site of the Camco plant
- Empty and boarded up Industrial warehouse/factory complex
- Canadian Pacific Railway bridge, (formerly known as the TH & B Railway bridge
- Chedoke Civic Golf & Ski Club
  - Chedoke Civic Golf Course gates, north-west corner, (originally were the front gates to Dundurn Park)
  - Chedoke Beddoe Civil Golf Course
  - Chedoke Winter Sports Park
- Aberdeen Court, (7-storey apartment building)
- Durand neighbourhood 20c castles/ mansions
- Holy Trinity Ethiopian Orthodox Church
- Yugal Kunj - Radha Krishna Temple and Community Centre
- Locke Street Shopping District
- Aberdeen Apartments, (4-storey apartment complex)
- James Street Stairway (Mountain-access)
- Bruce Trail
- Niagara Escarpment (mountain)

== Bridge Replacement ==
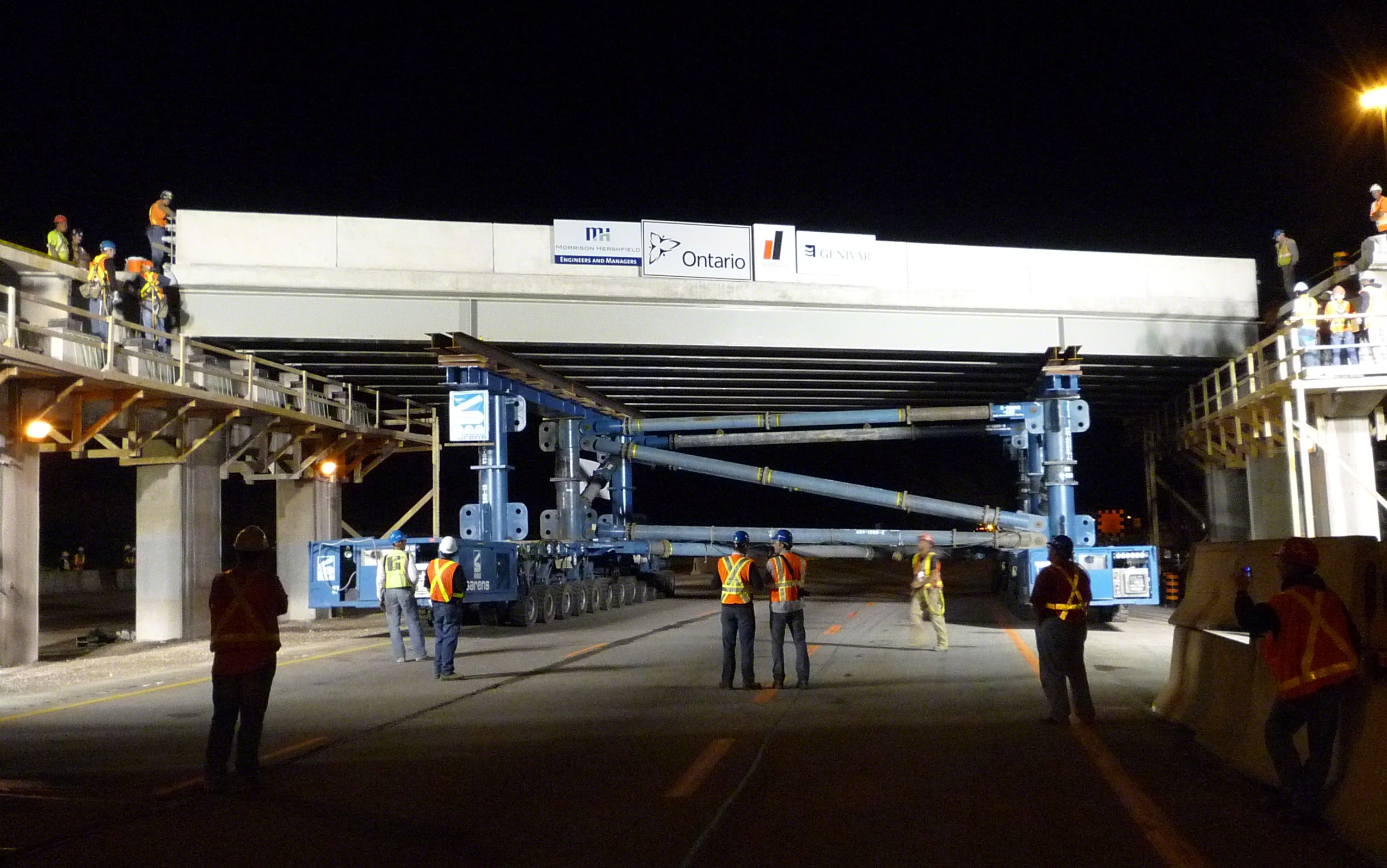
Self-propelled modular transporters moving Aberdeen Bridge span into place.

The Aberdeen Avenue bridge which was constructed in 1963, was found to have advanced deterioration including on the deck, bridge containment, and non-performing bearings by the Ministry of Transportation of Ontario (MTO). The MTO decided to go with a rapid bridge replacement process, replacing the entire Aberdeen Avenue bridge deck in a weekend instead of taking the usual nine to twelve months to complete it. Reasons for the decision included minimizing disruptions to the travelling public, improved construction safety and reduced construction costs.

MTO retained the engineering and management firm Morrison Hershfield as lead consultant. The rapid bridge replacement process began the evening of July 30, 2010. The old bridge was lifted away and replaced with a pre-constructed bridge that was built nearby. The process was completed on August 3, 2010. Dufferin Construction Company successfully executed the complete replacement.

This project was the first time rapid replacement technology has been used over a major highway in Southern Ontario. It is also part of a larger project to repair or replace eight bridges along Highway 403 in Hamilton. This $35.8 million investment is expected to create or sustain approximately 415 jobs as part of the Ontario Open plan.

On February 26, 2011, the Hamilton/Halton Engineering Week committee selected the Ontario Ministry of Transportation, Morrison Hershfield and Dufferin Construction team as the recipients of the 2011 Project of the Year in the Civil Engineering category for the Highway 403/ Aberdeen Avenue Rapid Bridge Replacement.

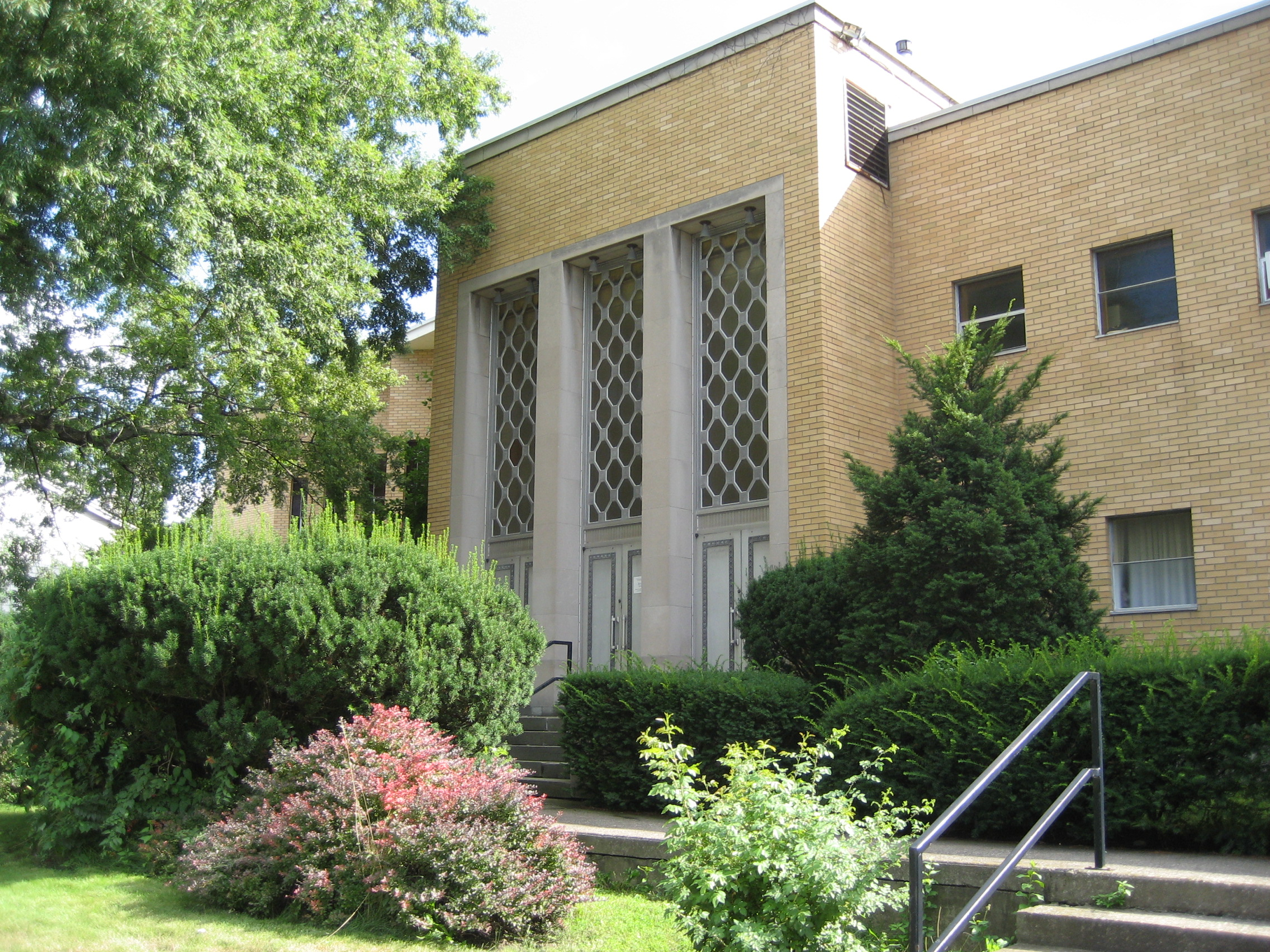
Yugal Kunj - Radha Krishna Temple and Community Centre

== Communities ==
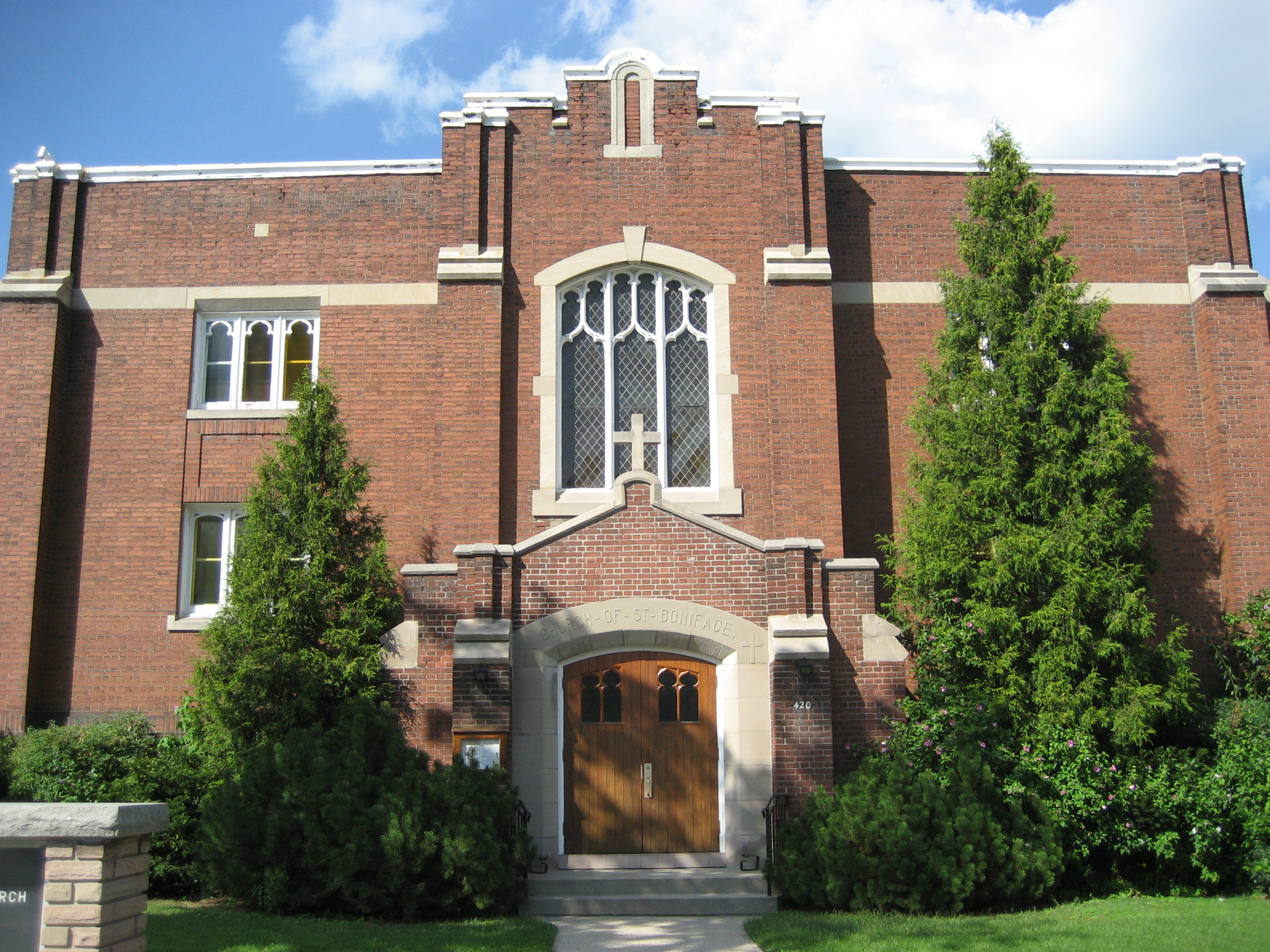
Holy Trinity Ethiopian Orthodox Church

Note: listing of neighbourhoods from west to east.

- Kirkendall North/ Chedoke Park B, Aberdeen Avenue cuts through these two neighbourhoods.
- Kirkendall North/ Kirkendall South, Aberdeen Avenue cuts through these two neighbourhoods.
- Durand

== Images ==
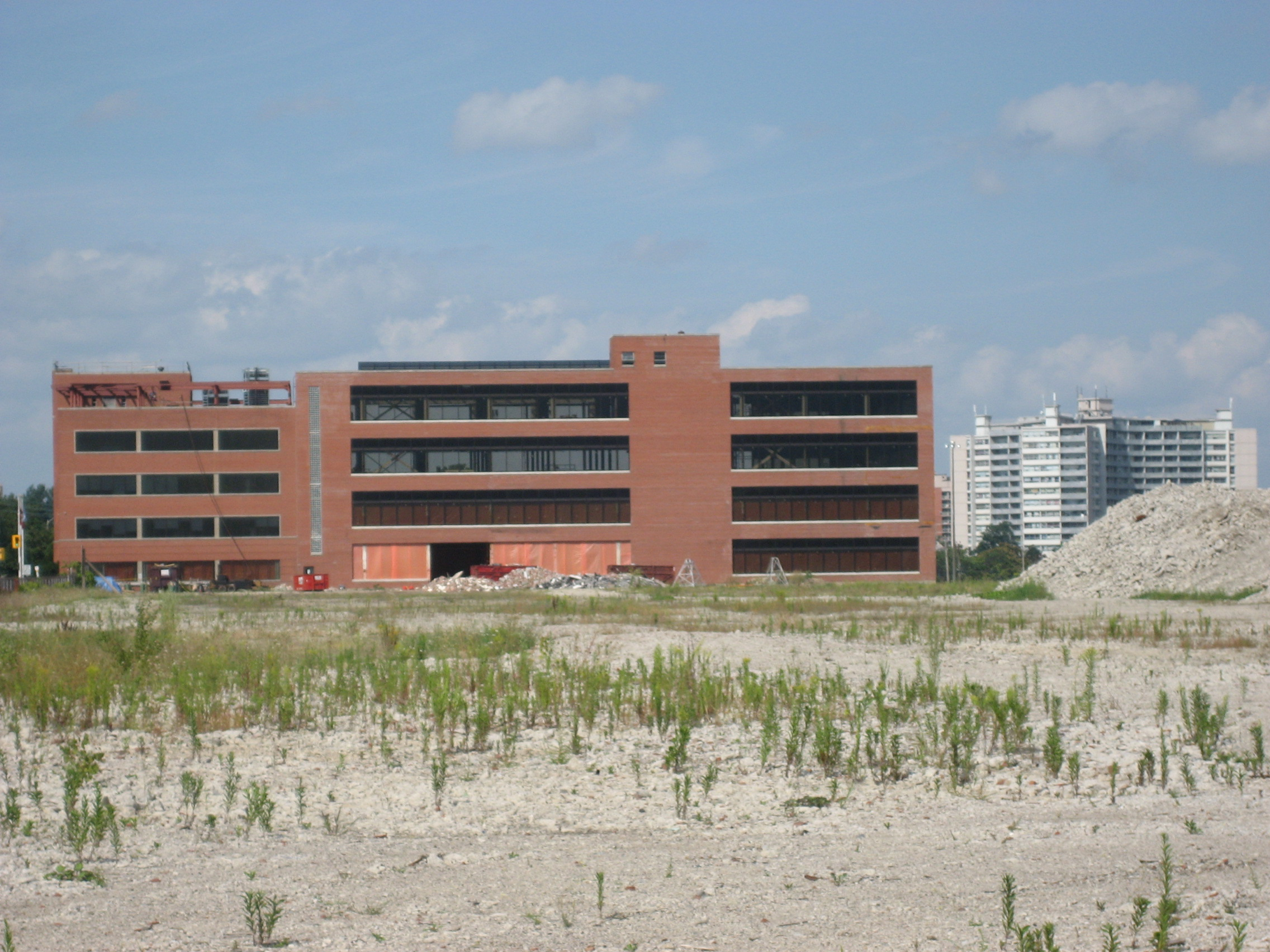
McMaster Innovation Park (August 2008)

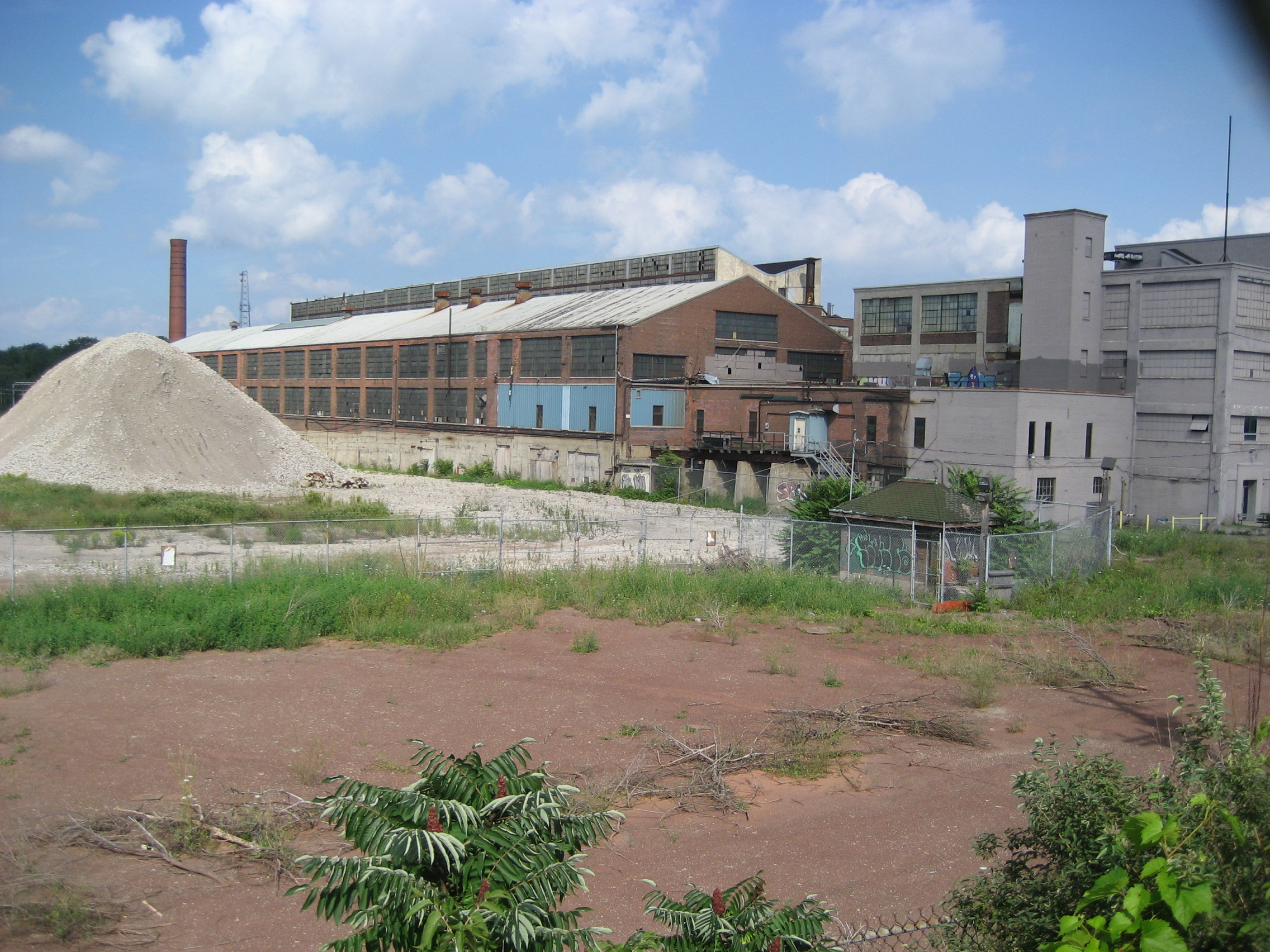
Empty Industrial warehouse/factory complex

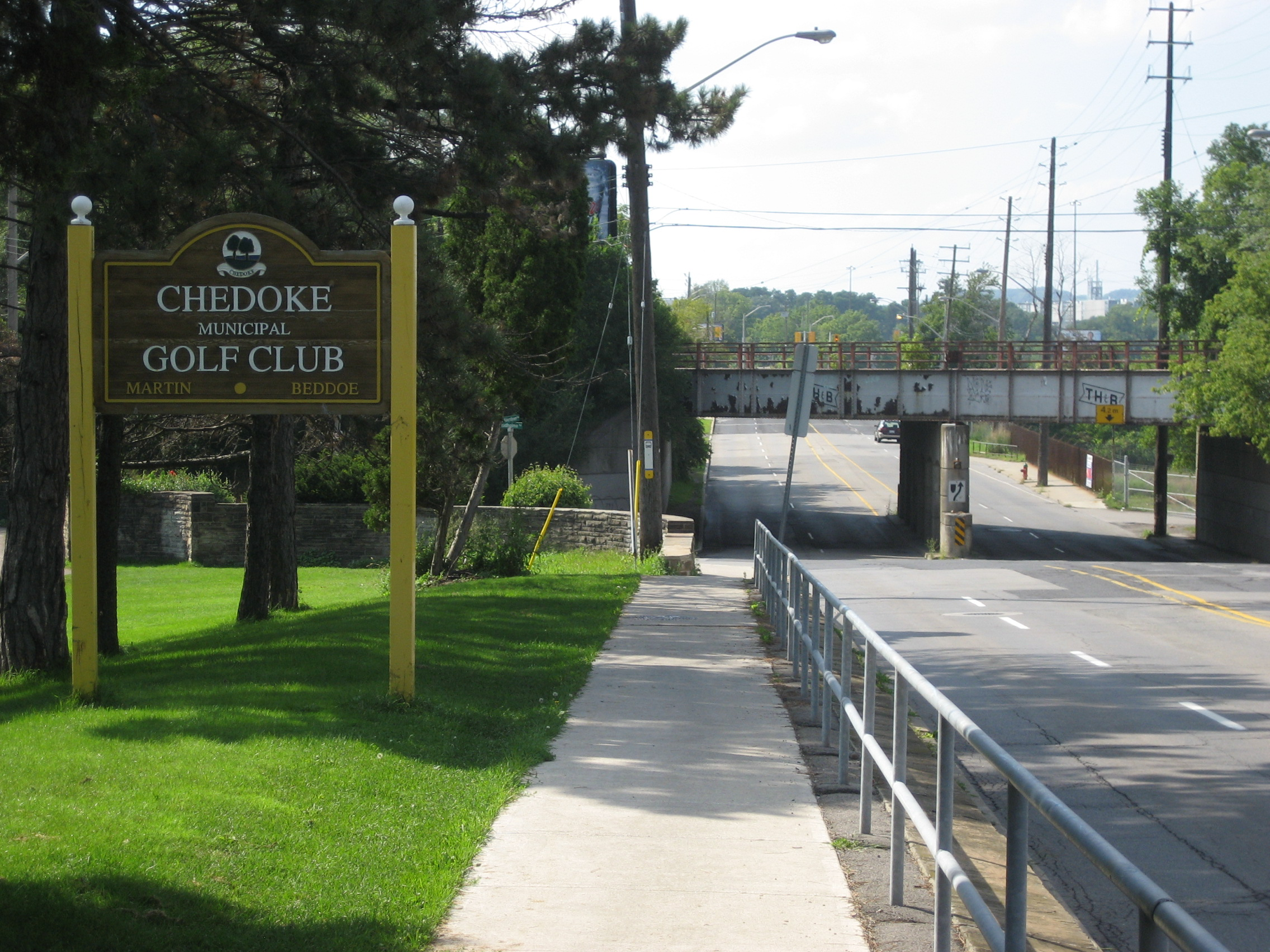
Western-end of Aberdeen Avenue

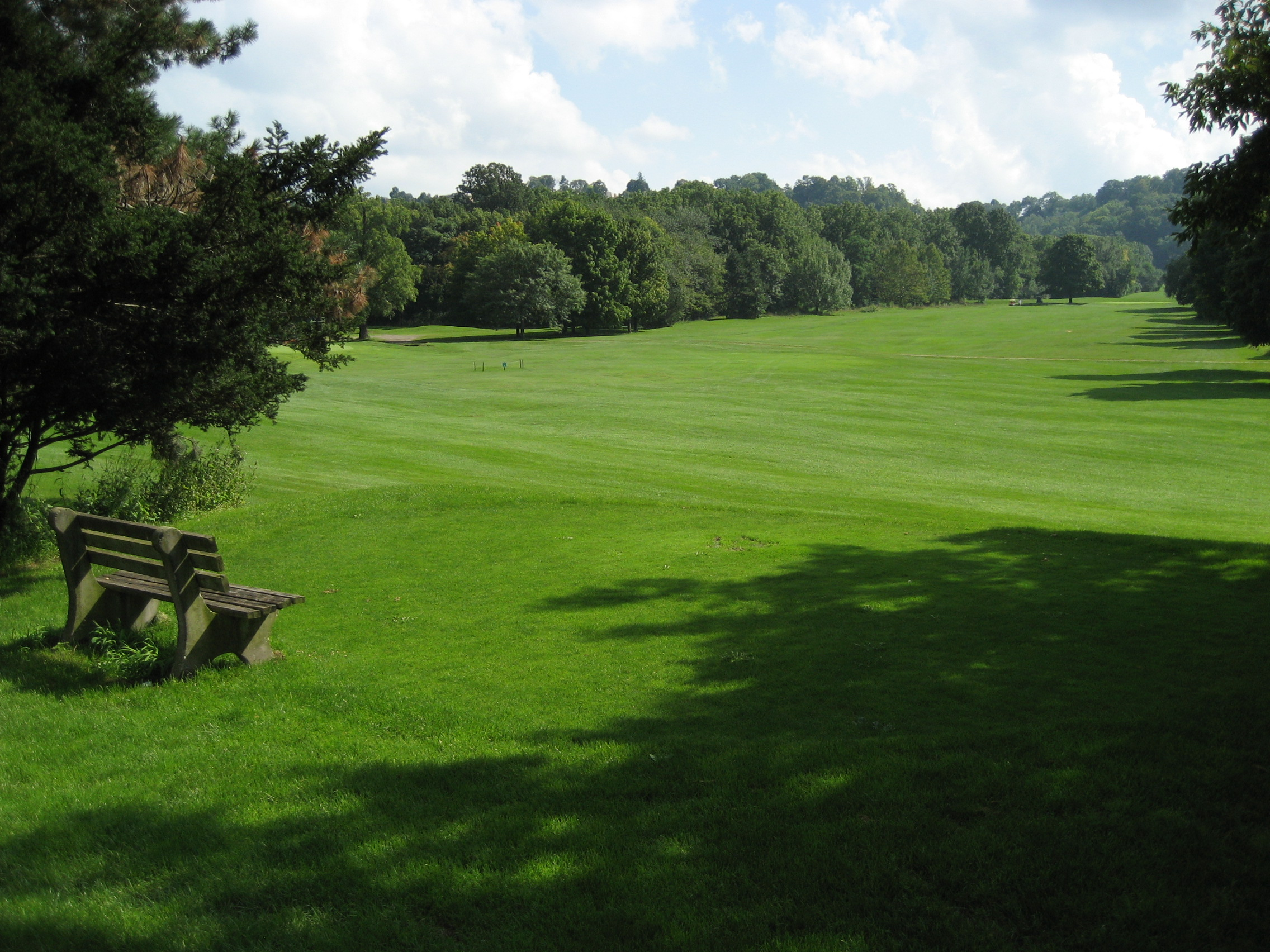
Chedoke Civic Golf Course

== See also ==
- Niagara Escarpment Commission
