= Carson Morrison =

Canadian engineer (1902–1993)

Carson Frederick Morrison
- Born: August 23, 1902; File Hills, Saskatchewan, Canada
- Died: August 18, 1993 (aged 90)
- Education: B.E., Civil Engineering, University of Saskatchewan 1925 M.Sc. Structural Engineering, McGill University 1927
- Spouse: Jean Yvonne Apps
- Engineering career
- Practice name: Morrison Hershfield
- Projects: Widening of Leaside Bridge. Investigation into 1959 collapse of Listowel Arena. Site selection for the Prince Albert Radar Laboratory in Prince Albert, Saskatchewan.
- Awards: Professional Engineers Ontario - Professional Engineering Gold Medal, 1974. Elected as a Fellow of the Engineering Institute of Canada, 1974. Canadian Standards Association - John Jenkins Award, 1980.

Carson F. Morrison, P.Eng. (1902–1993) was a university professor, innovative engineer, magazine editor, co-founder of the North American firm Morrison Hershfield, and president of a standards association. He was considered to be a touchstone for professional ethics and morality in engineering. He is remembered for his ideas and advice, knowledge and imagination.

== Early life and education ==
Morrison was born on a farm in File Hills, in what is now Saskatchewan but then, in 1902, was called the Northwest Territories. He graduated from the University of Saskatchewan in Structural Engineering. He later taught there part-time and then continued on to McGill University where he received his Master of Science degree in Structural Engineering.

His masters thesis (1927) is titled "The Effect of the Manner of Support and of Certain Details of Construction on the Secondary Stresses in a Roof Truss".

== Working life ==
Morrison was a Civil Engineering and Mathematics Lecturer, University of Alberta (1927–1928). He was with the University of Toronto from 1928 to 1968, first as a Lecturer and later as a professor. His primary teachings were in the field of civil engineering. His knowledge and interests particularly lied in wood structures and guyed towers. During the post-war years Morrison, along with fellow engineers Charles Hershfield, Joe Millman, and Mark Huggins responded to the building boom by establishing the firm Morrison Hershfield Millman and Huggins in Toronto in 1946. At that time the firm offered civil, structural, and mechanical engineering services. With the company until the time of his death in 1993, Morrison's roles included that of Principal, President and chairman. The firm eventually grew to become the North American company Morrison Hershfield, providers and integrators of specialized multidisciplinary engineering and related expertise.

As a result of the engineering expertise of Morrison Hershfield's co-founders, many of the projects were investigations and problem solving. An early project undertaken by Morrison was to provide a solution to the "galloping" of the guys supporting the newly constructed radio antenna array towers at the Canadian International Service short wave transmitter at Sackville, New Brunswick. This phenomenon results under specific climatic conditions which causes the guys to oscillate in a dramatic fashion. Failure to provide appropriate damping exposes the structure to serious risk.

Morrison was also a published author and editor. One book he published that was of significant impact on the engineering community was "Professional Engineering Practice: Ethical Aspects" (1982). This book covered topics ranging from the Structure of the Code of Ethics to, Professional Engineers in the Manufacturing Industry, to International Engineering Work. Updated versions of this book are still used in engineering programs today as a basic guide to professional conduct.

Morrison was the founding editor of Canadian Consulting Engineer magazine and took a lead in establishing the Canadian Consulting Engineering awards. He held the role of editor from 1959 to 1978.

From 1973 to 1975, Morrison was president of Canadian Standards Association.

== Notable projects ==
- Pinetree Line and Mid-Canada Line site supervision and engineering in Ontario's far north
- Widening of the Leaside Bridge in Toronto, Ontario
- Investigation into the tragic 1959 collapse of the Listowel Arena, Listowel Ontario, which took 8 lives. This led to changes in the building codes to recognize the effects of non-uniform snow loading, together with the establishment of a requirement for regular inspection of all arenas.
- Investigation into the 1966 collapse of Heron Road Bridge in Ottawa, Ontario. The collapse took nine lives. Using two models, Morrison demonstrated that a properly-braced falsework could hold two times the weight of one with inadequate bracing. Just like the bridge, which was under construction at the time, the model that was not properly braced crashed to the ground.
- Site selection for the Prince Albert Radar Laboratory in Prince Albert, Saskatchewan.

== Awards and achievements ==
- Honorary Member, Ontario Association of Architects, 1963
- Professional Engineering Gold Medal, Professional Engineers Ontario, 1974
- Elected as a Fellow of the Engineering Institute of Canada, 1974
- Canadian Silver Jubilee Medal, 1977
- The Canadian Standards Association John Jenkins Award, 1980
- Association of Consulting Engineers of Canada / Canadian Consulting Engineer Magazine Carson F. Morrison Award, 1984 (an award named in Morrison's honour)
- Professional Engineers Ontario admitted Carson Morrison to the Order of Honour in 1984. The highest distinction, the rank of Companion recognizes contributions that exceed those of Officer. It is exclusively given to individuals who have profoundly influenced the engineering profession through their service.
- Standards Council of Canada Jean-Paul Carriere Award, 1984. Awarded for distinguished service to Canadian standardization.

== See also ==
- Charles Hershfield
- Morrison Hershfield
