= Centennial Garage =

Coordinates: 53°25′37″N 113°35′10″W

The Centennial Garage is part of the Edmonton Transit Service (ETS) and is a targeted LEED Silver project. The bus garage was designed for the storage and maintenance of 250 regular and articulated buses as well as administration offices, dispatch and support spaces for staff. It is located at 15520 Ellerslie Road on the east side 156 Street SW in Edmonton, Alberta. This garage provides bus services to neighbourhoods in west, southwest, and downtown Edmonton. It is the first new garage to open in the City in 25 years.

== Construction ==
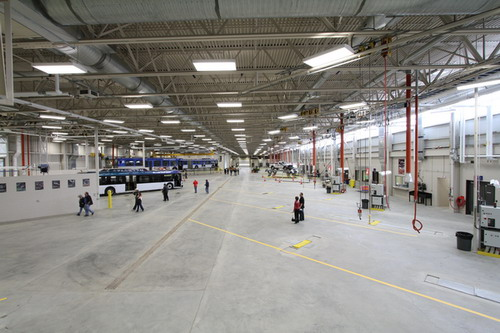
Interior of the Edmonton Centennial Garage during the official opening.

Construction of the garage began in spring of 2008 and was completed on April 10, 2010, with its first day of operation being April 26, 2010. This project budget was an estimated $99 million with $89.3 million coming from the provincial government's Municipal Sustainability Initiative. The building is approximately 313,000 square feet (29,100 m^{2}) in size.

A large portion of the materials used in this green building have recycled content. According to ETS, 90% of the structural steel, 27.5% of the concrete, and 68% of the steel decking is recycled material. The Centennial Garage includes 81 miles (130 km) of in slab heating pipe, 3,300 sprinkler heads, 1.25 miles (2.01 km) of foundation grade beam, 11,800 cubic metres of concrete, 43 roof top units, 7 acres (28,000 m^{2}) of roof, 1,325 imperial tons of steel and 31 miles (50 km) of electrical conduit.

Firms involved in this project were Croy D. Yee Architect Limited who provided the architectural work. Morrison Hershfield Limited provided civil, structural, mechanical, code, fire protection and building envelope engineering and project management related services. Other firms involved were Earthscape Consultants for landscape design, Suncord Engineering who also provided mechanical engineering services and Clark Builders for construction management services.

== Energy usage ==
Some unique features of the building include but are not limited to reduction of heat islands which can impact the local microclimate, highly reflective roofing reducing the cooling energy required, indoor bus storage to provide inherent energy savings and water efficiency technologies to reduce the amount of water consumption on both the administration and bus maintenance sides of the building. Energy modeling test results indicated that the Centennial Garage is approximately 33% more energy efficient than a typical Canadian building of its size and type.

== LEED goals ==
Some LEED goals established and upheld during the construction phase and continued after the completion of the garage are as follows:

- Diversion of 80% of construction waste away from landfills
- Regional manufacturing of over 30% of the building materials
- No use of ozone-depleting refrigerants in the mechanical equipment
- Stormwater diversion to the snow dump site to assist in melting process
- Good air quality for construction workers during building phase and for staff after completion
- Use of low-emitting materials such as paints and coating, adhesives and sealants, carpets and particle board
- Specialized washing system for buses that cuts down on water use by more than half
- Low-consumption water fixtures in washrooms, showers and kitchen
- Landscape plants that only require natural watering
- Significant use of recycled building materials
- Use of hybrid vehicles by staff
- Snow melt cooling system
