= Morrison Hershfield =

Canadian engineering and management consulting firm

- Company type: Private (employee-owned)
- Industry: Engineering/ Consulting
- Founded: 1946
- Headquarters: Toronto, Ontario, Canada
- Key people: Anthony Karakatsanis (President and CEO)
- Products: Multidisciplinary engineering services
- Number of employees: 700+ (2011)
- Website: www.morrisonhershfield.com

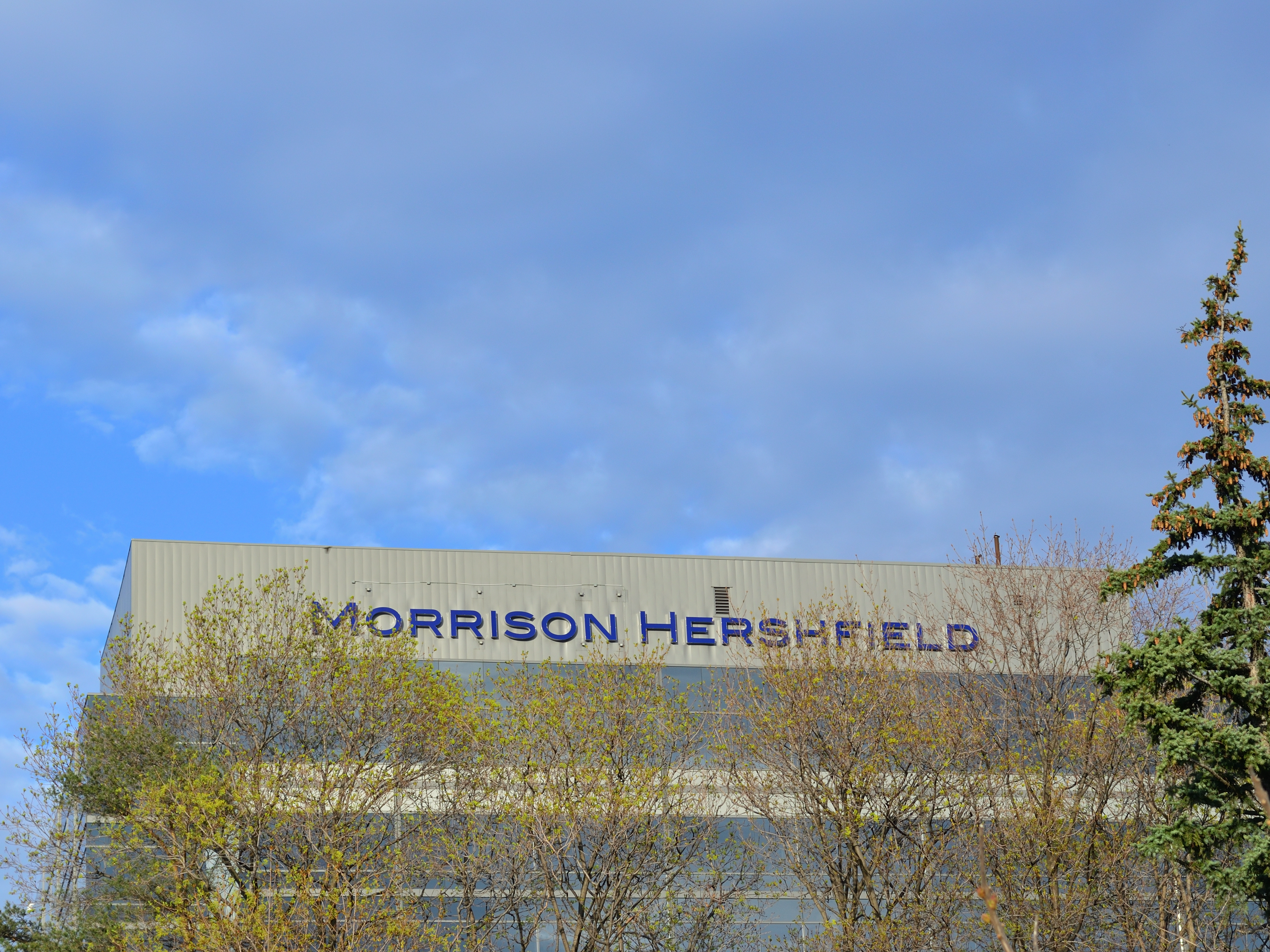
Morrison Hershfield in Markham

Morrison Hershfield is a professional services firm, subsidiary of Stantec since Jan 2024, providing engineering and management consulting services in the areas of energy and industrial, buildings, technology and telecom, transportation, environment, water and wastewater, and land development. The firm has 16 offices across North America.

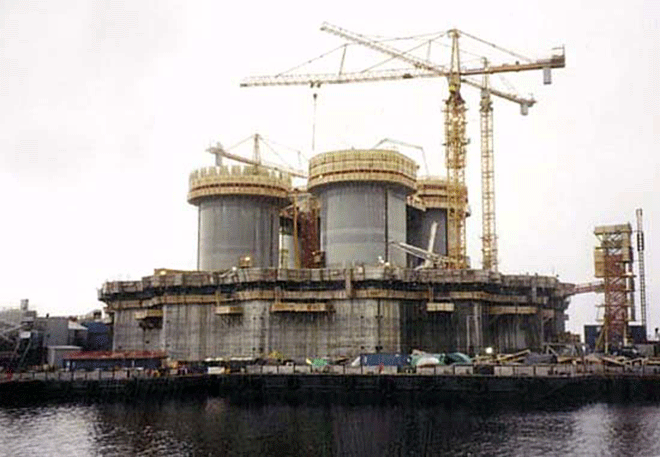
Hibernia Gravity Base Structure while it was under construction

== History ==
Morrison Hershfield was established in 1946 in Toronto, Ontario when Carson Morrison, Charles Hershfield, Joe Millman and Mark Huggins responded to needs of the post-war building boom by forming a partnership offering civil, structural and mechanical engineering services. Since that time Morrison Hershfield has merged with Rolf Jensen and Associates; Maunder Britnell Inc.; Maxim Engineering; Mitchell, Pound and Braddock Ltd., Ruys & Company, Suncord Engineering Ltd., Jeffers Engineering Associates and Structural Design Inc. Morrison Hershfield is a minority equity partner in Sikon Inc.

== Operations ==
Morrison Hershfield has interests in the following fields: building services engineering, civil engineering, code consulting, construction management, electrical engineering, environmental science, fire protection engineering, hydraulic engineering, industrial engineering, mechanical engineering, petroleum engineering, project management, structural engineering, sustainable design, telecommunications engineering and transportation engineering.

== Notable projects ==
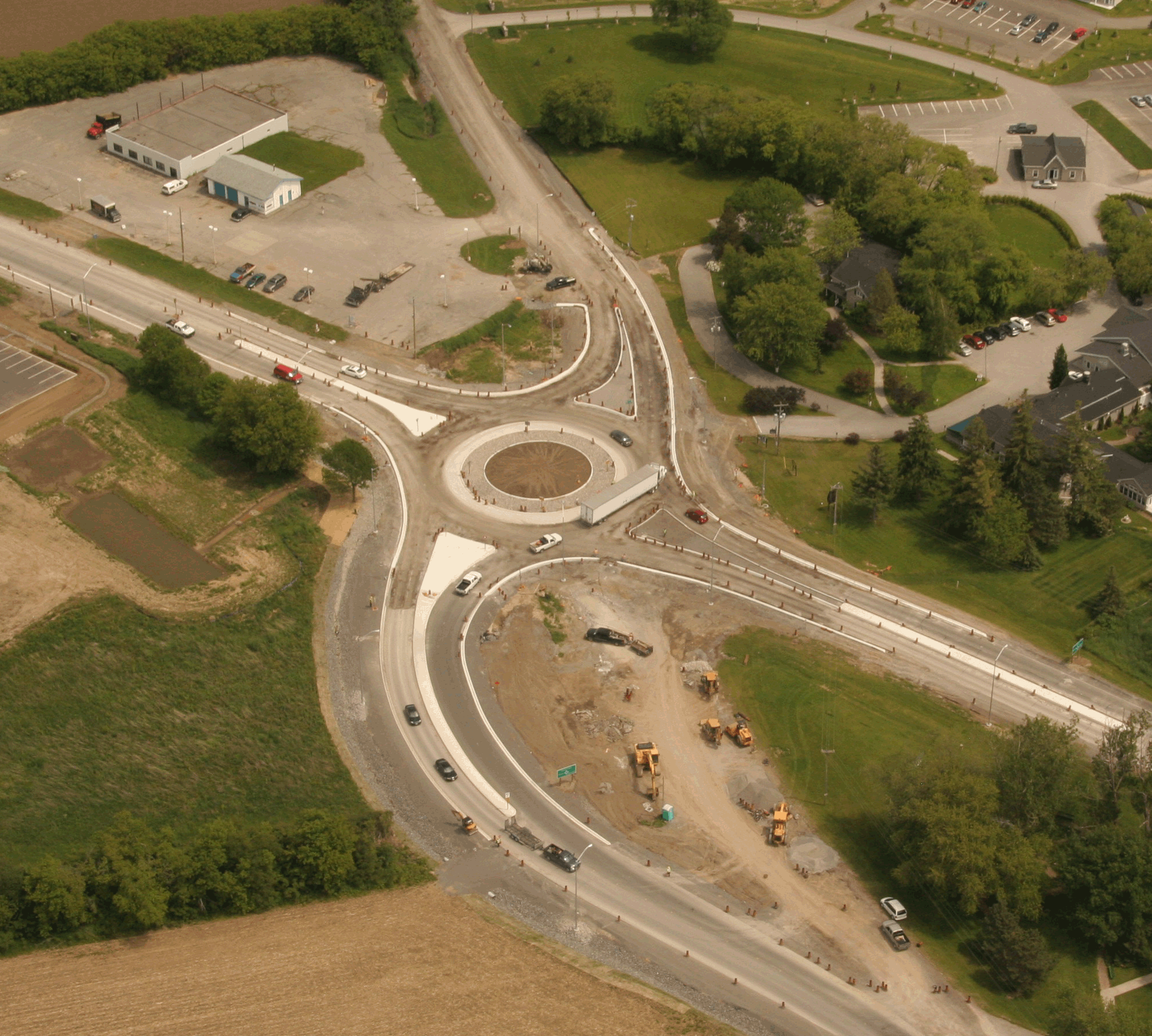
Ontario Highway 33 roundabout near completion

- The Hibernia Gravity Base Structure – An oil platform off the coast of St. John's, Newfoundland, Morrison Hershfield was retained to assist in the development of a structural solution with adequate strength which was also constructible. Hibernia was the first Gravity Base Structure ever designed to withstand iceberg impact. (Completed in 1997)
- The Alberta SuperNet – Provided engineering and management services for a high speed performance network connecting 429 communities across Alberta, Canada. High bandwidth (OC3) microwave radio was used for a 121 km wireless link to a remote community. The link was believed at the time of construction to be the longest of its kind in the world. (Completed in 2005)
- The Richmond Olympic Oval – As Building Envelope consultants for this facility, one of Morrison Hershfield's roles was the use of inventive cladding materials. They used polycarbonate cladding (similar to a translucent plastic) to cover very large wall areas. Traditional materials such as curtain wall, metal siding and composite metal cladding were also used. (Completed in 2008)
- Ontario Highway 33 – Provided detail design for the realignment and reconfiguration of the existing intersection at Highway 33 and Country Road 1 in Ontario, Canada into a single lane roundabout with a central island and truck apron. (Completed in 2009)
- The Vancouver Convention Centre – Building envelope consultants for this LEED Platinum project. Morrison Hershfield was a key partner to ensuring quality assurance and conducting enhanced field review during construction of all building envelope components including innovative curtain wall glazing and green roof. (Completed in 2009)
- The Simcoe Street Tunnel – A $40 million project with a roof structure designed to carry all 16 pre-existing railway tracks while the ground structure provides 2 lanes north bound and 1 lane south bound vehicular connections as well as one bicycle lane and one extra wide pedestrian sidewalk on each side of the tunnel. Morrison Hershfield provided the project management, design, contract administration and site engineering for this tunnel. (Completed in 2009)
- Highway 403 / Aberdeen Avenue Bridge – Rapid Bridge Replacement technology was used in the City of Hamilton, Canada for the first ever multi-span bridge replacement in North America. The replacement was completed in 51 hours. (Completed in 2010)
- Grouse Mountain Wind Turbine – Retained as the structural engineer for this 1.5 megawatt wind turbine, it is the first wind turbine built in North America in an extreme high altitude location and is expected to supply 25% of the Grouse Mountain resort's electricity. (Completed in 2010)
- The Edmonton Transit System Centennial Garage – As prime consultant, managed a large multidisciplinary team to deliver a state-of-the-art LEED Silver certified 313,000-square-foot (29,100 m^{2}) facility for the storage and maintenance of 250 regular and articulated buses. (Completed in 2010)
- The City Creek Center – Located in Salt Lake City, Utah, Morrison Hershfield was retained for the building envelope work for two underground parking garages, five residential/office buildings, multiple retail stores, one building rehabilitation, and areas around and beneath the man-made stream and fountain areas. (Expected completion 2012)
- The Grand River Bridge – A Context Sensitive Design Workshop was conducted for the heritage Caledonia bridge in Ontario, Canada. A number of issues were found requiring action, included structural deficiencies, structural deterioration, insufficient roadside safety, foundation problems and inadequate hydraulics. (Expected completion 2012)
- Highway 401 / Hogg's Hollow Bridge – Lead consultants for a Total Project Management (TPM) Detailed Design assignment for the rehabilitation of a busy 14 lane highway bridge in Toronto, Ontario, Canada. (Expected completion 2012)
- The Niagara Tunnel Project – Lead Consulting Engineer for the outside works including all tunnel intake works. (Expected completion 2013)
- The Detroit River International Crossing – One of three engineering firms that developed cost estimates for right of way and utility relocation; design and construction; and operation and maintenance on the Canadian side of the crossing. (Expected completion 2016)

== See also ==
- Carson Morrison
- Charles Hershfield
