= Locke Street (Hamilton, Ontario) =

Canadian road

Coordinates: 43.2645°N 79.8820°W

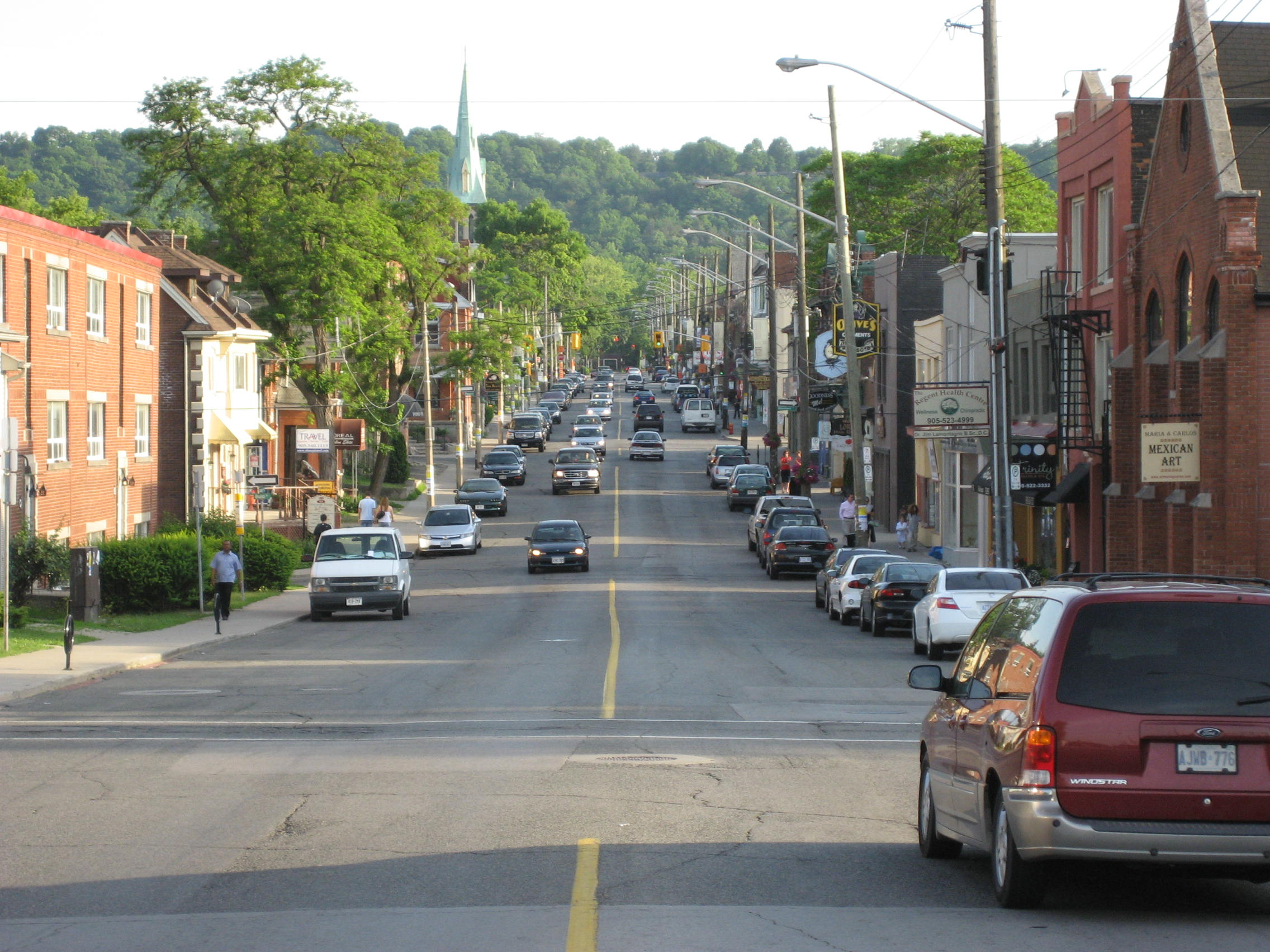
Locke Street South

Locke Street is a Lower City collector road in Hamilton, Ontario, Canada. It starts off at Aberdeen Avenue as a two-way street going through the Locke Street shopping district up to Main Street where it then becomes a one-way street until it crosses King Street and becomes two-way again going north past Victoria Park and ends just past Barton Street West on Tecumseh Street, a road that winds West and leads to the back-end of Dundurn Park.

== History ==
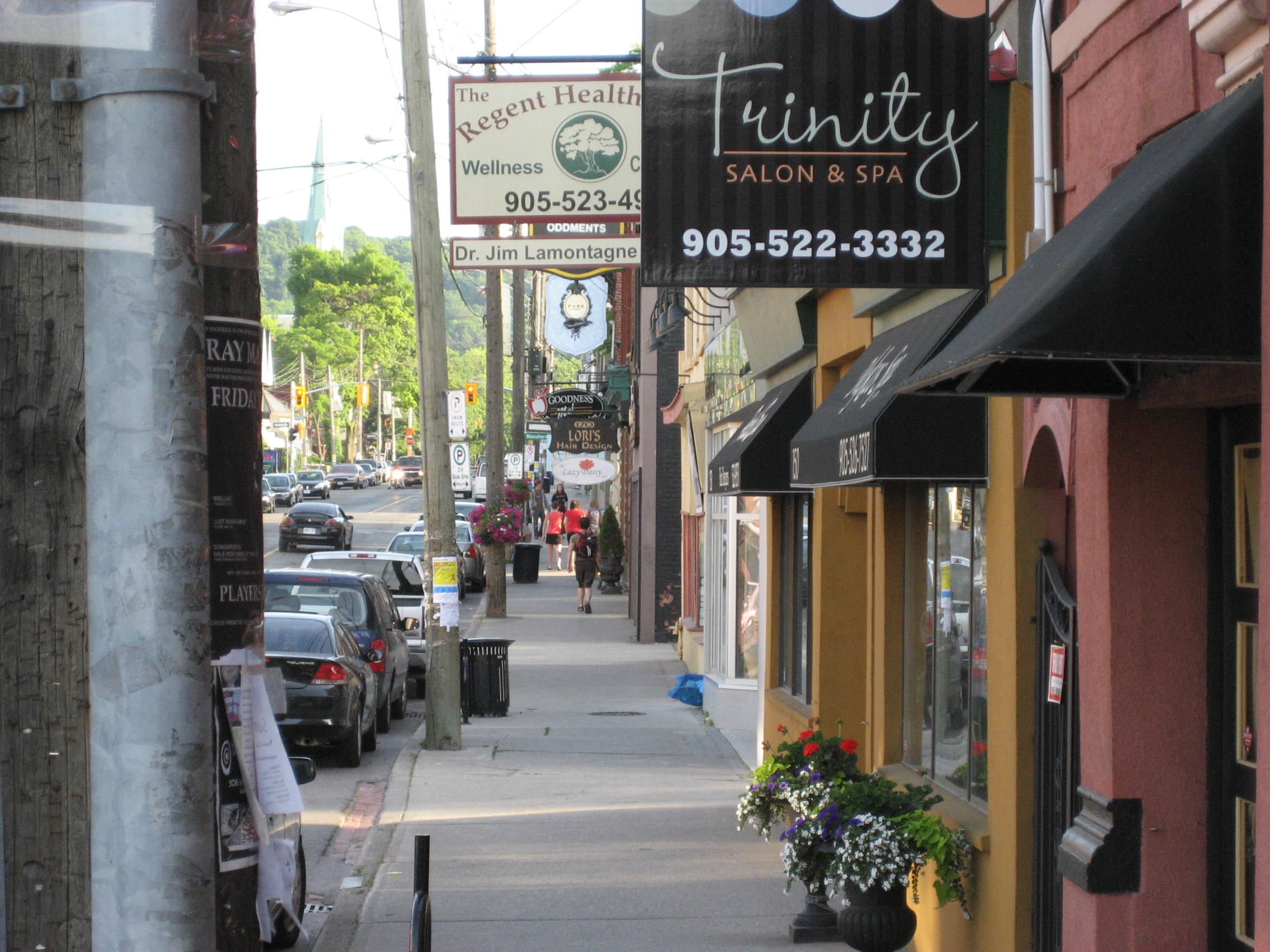
Locke Street South, walking tour

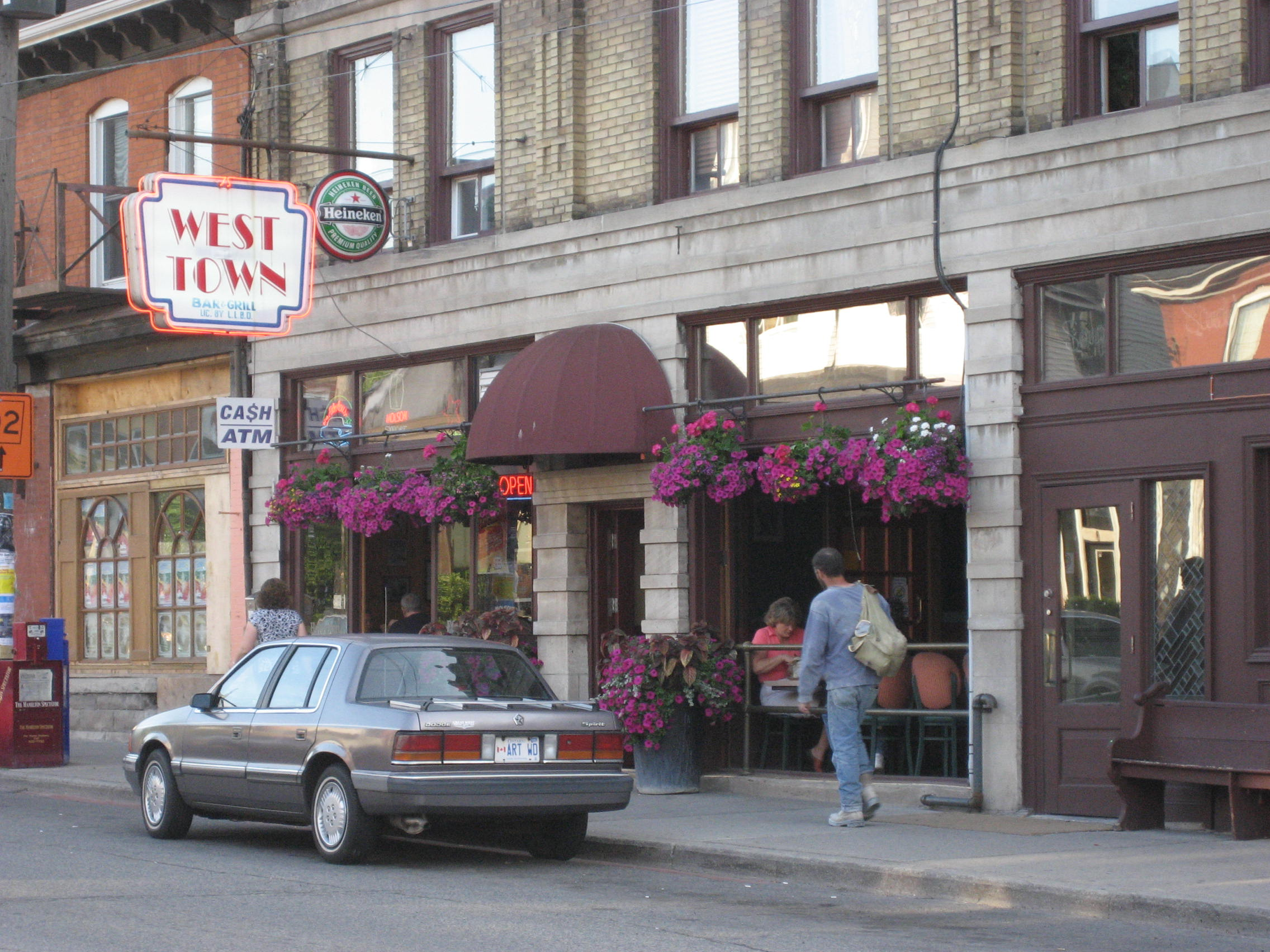
Locke Street South, walking tour

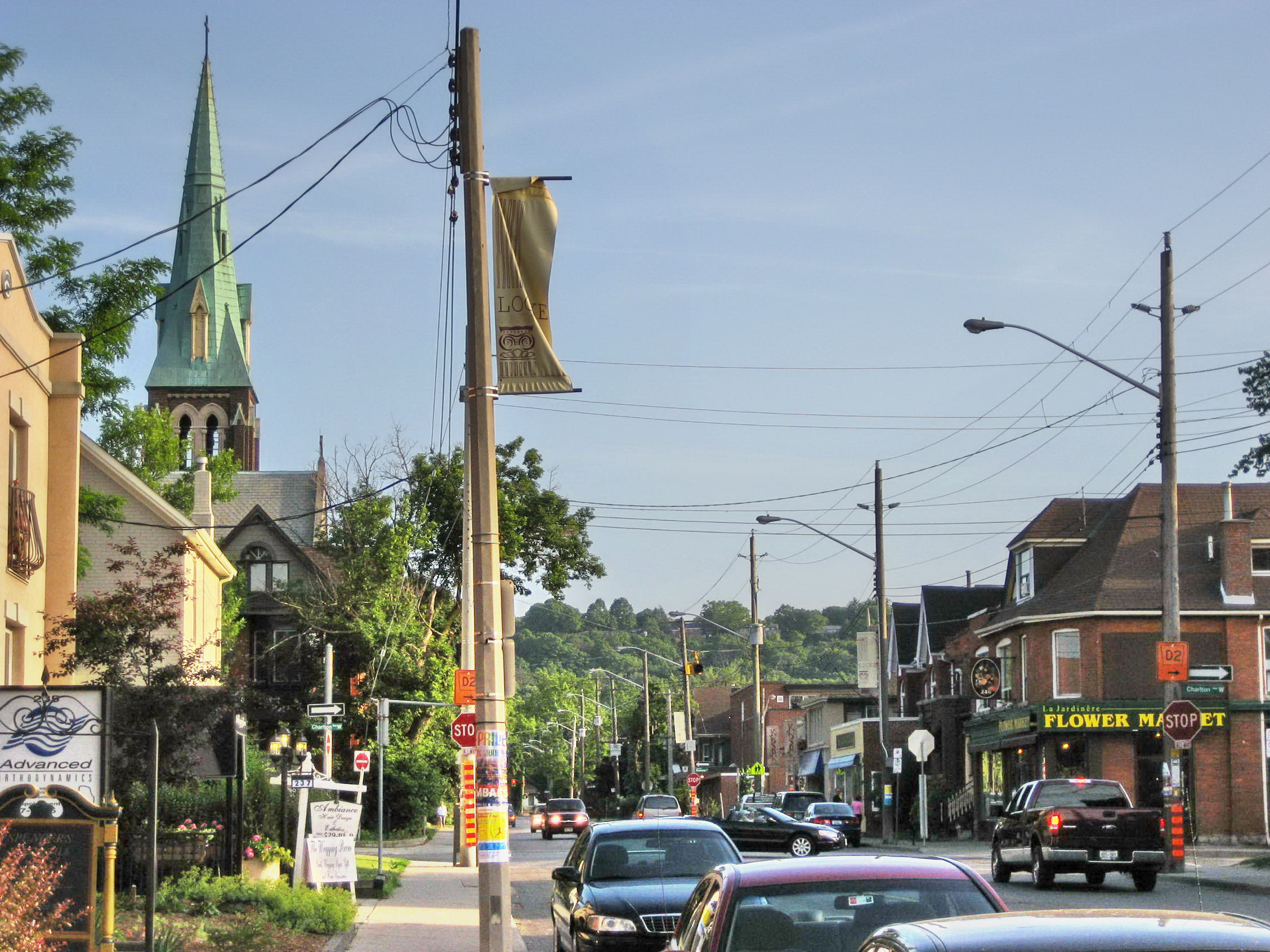
Locke Street South, walking tour

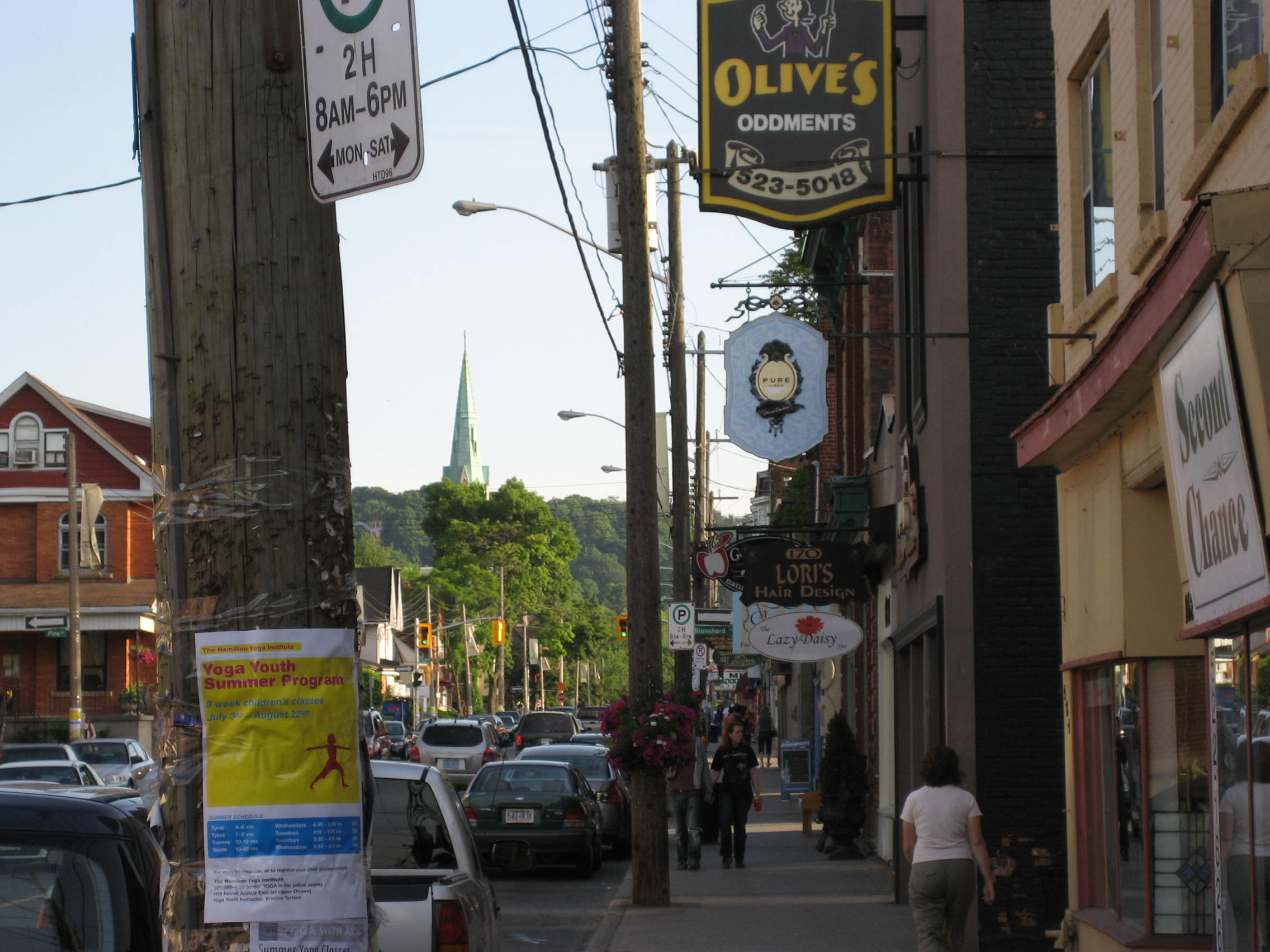

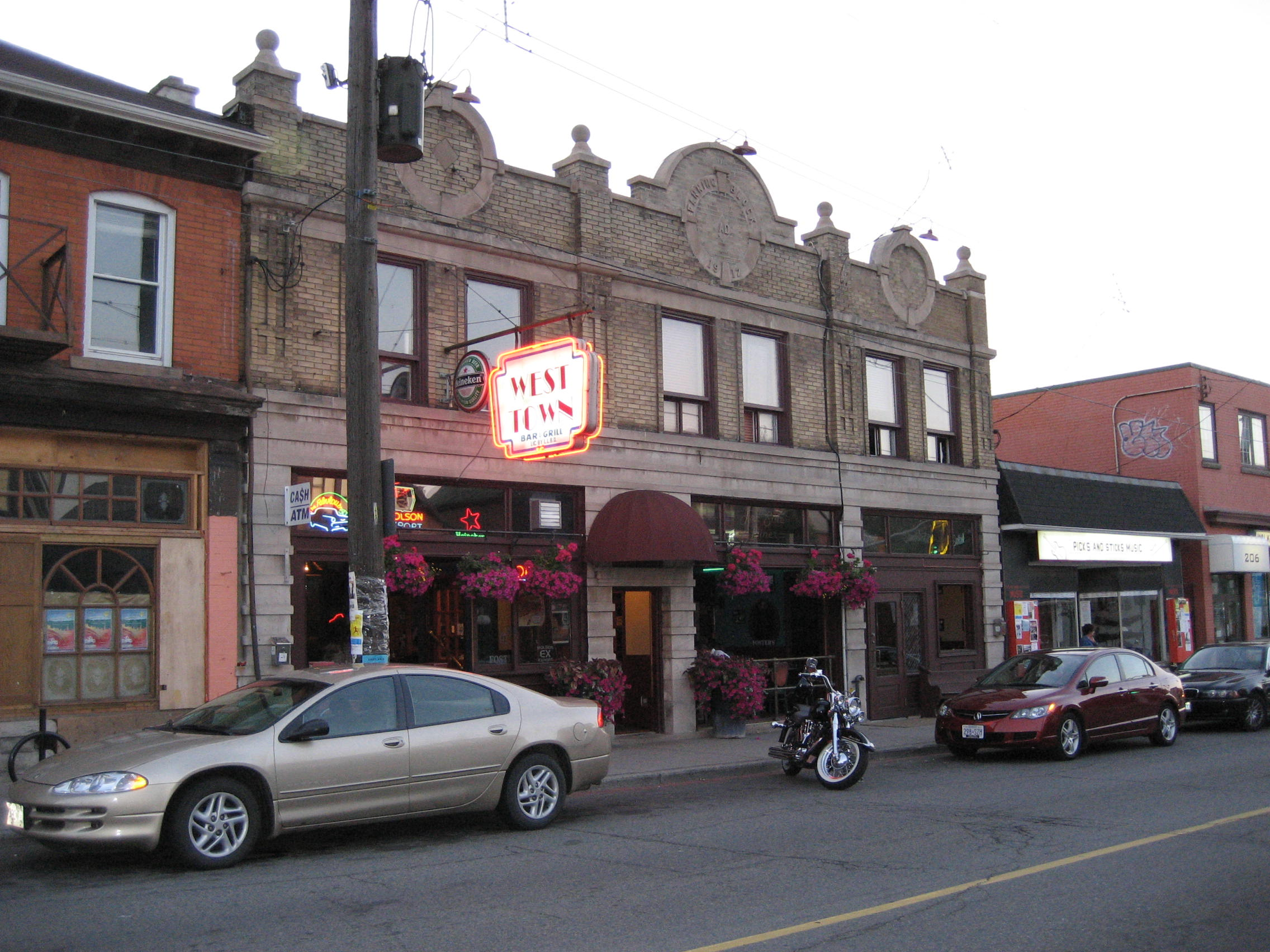

The origins of Locke Street's name can be traced back as early as 1840, when it was spelled "Lock"; by 1870 the spelling was standardized to "Locke." North of King Street West was known as Railway Street because it ran to the Great Western Railway yards. Locke Street North is mostly residential and in the 1800s most of the homes there belonged to the railway workers and their families.

Locke Street is a "street of churches" and a "hub for antique shops." The early churches were founded as follows:

- 1886: Locke Street Presbyterian Church
- 1891: Saint John the Evangelist Anglican Church
- 1893: Saint Joseph's Roman Catholic Church
- 1897: Immanuel Congregational Church
- 1897: Herkimer Street Baptist Church

Prior to 1853, just south of Herkimer Street on Locke was the site of the Beasley Racetrack. The racetrack was named after its owner and operator Richard Beasley (1761–1842), who was a soldier, political figure, farmer and businessman. It was a popular spot featuring both trotting and steeplechase racing.

Just off Locke near Charlton, the Hamilton Amateur Athletic Association Grounds is a park that was home to the Hamilton Tiger-Cats from 1872–1949. Today it is also the site of the Hamilton Tennis Club. Before it was used for football, the park was the site of a cricket club, and in 1860 a racquet club was established near the present site of the Hamilton Tennis Club. In 1870, Locke South was described as a "sparsely populated mud track."

Despite rapid expansion of the city, Locke Street South was still an isolated area. On the other hand, Locke Street North continued with its residential growth and the development of Victoria Park and the opening of the Crystal Palace. The Crystal Palace opened up at Victoria Park on 20 September 1860 by Edward, Prince of Wales (who later became King Edward VII). It was home to the area's largest fall fair (agriculture exhibition) for many years. The Hamilton Herald reported on 22 September 1890 that "The Carnival of Venice, The Paris Exposition or the World's Fair in Chicago will be nowhere tomorrow when the great Central Fair is opened at the Crystal Palace Grounds in this city." The structure was demolished in 1891.

By 1885, Locke Street South began to grow, after a brick sewer was constructed and gas lines were laid. In 1889, Wesley Vollick, a cabinet maker, built a small brick cottage that in 1924 became the Locke Street Library.

In 1890, The Hamilton Street Railway (HSR) built its western terminus on the northeast corner of Locke & Herkimer Streets. A two-storey tram building and horse barn which could accommodate up to 42 horses and 12 tram cars. As well, the Hamilton-Dundas Electric Railway line, nicknamed the "Dundas Dummy", travelled along Aberdeen Avenue and crossed over Locke Street South.

In 2000, Locke Street South celebrated its 150th anniversary.

In March 2018 a small group of people vandalized businesses on Locke Street in response to gentrification in Hamilton.

== Festivals ==
Locke Street has festivals held throughout the year. One is called Spring Blooms on Locke, an annual festival that marks the end of winter and is also a fundraiser for sick children. The Locke Street Festival where each September the street is closed off for a day with live entertainment, street vendors, and food. The Christmas Open House celebrates the holidays with businesses open late, food, drink, and carollers each November.
