= Audrey Girouard =

Canadian human computer interaction researcher

- Education: École Polytechnique de Montréal (BEng); Tufts University (MS, PhD)
- Awards: Technology Ambassador Award, Partners in Research (2017); Ontario Early Researcher Award; Carleton University Research Achievement Award (2014)
- Scientific career
- Fields: Human–computer interaction
- Workplaces: Carleton University

Audrey Girouard is a Canadian computer scientist. She researches human–computer interaction. Girouard is an associate professor at Carleton University and the Director and Principal Investigator of the Collaborative Learning of Usability Experiences (CLUE) program. She is the first female faculty member at Carleton School of Information Technology.

== Education ==
Girouard received her undergraduate degree in Software Engineering from the École Polytechnique de Montréal. She received her Masters and PhD in Computer Science from Tufts University in Massachusetts.

== Career ==
Girouard is an associate professor in the School of Information Technology (CSIT) at Carleton University and the Director and Principal Investigator of the Collaborative Learning of Usability Experiences (CLUE) program. She researches human–computer interaction. As the first female member of Carleton School of Information Technology (CSIT), Girouard has been a strong voice in encouraging women in this field. Girouard is involved in hands-on outreach workshops, acting as a mentor for the Virtual Ventures summer camp.

Girouard and her lab, the Creative Interactions lab, focus on designing and developing deformable materials and flexible displays in order to pioneer new interaction techniques for users, complementary to the current touch capabilities of rigid screens.

== Awards ==
Among her accolades, Girouard is one of six distinguished Canadian scientists to be recognized for educational excellence as part of the Partners in Research National Awards in Science, Technology, Engineering, Mathematics and Biomedicine. Girouard received the Technology Ambassador Award for her contributions to education at the Partners in Research National Awards in Ottawa on Monday, May 9, 2017.

In recent years she has also received the Ontario Early Researcher Award as well as the Carleton University Research Achievement Award.
