= Subbarayan Pasupathy =

Indian-Canadian electrical engineer (1940-2023)

- Born: September 21, 1940; Chennai, India
- Died: February 12, 2023 (aged 82)
- Education: College of Engineering, Guindy; IIT Madras; Yale University
- Scientific career
- Fields: Telecommunications engineering; Communication theory
- Workplaces: University of Toronto
- Thesis: Optimum and Conventional Processing of Space-time Signals (1972)
- Doctoral advisor: Peter Schultheiss
- Doctoral students: Frank Kschischang

Subbarayan Pasupathy (September 21, 1940 – February 12, 2023) was an Indian-Canadian electrical engineer and a professor emeritus of Electrical and Computer Engineering at University of Toronto. He also served as the Chairman of the Communications Group and as the Associate Chairman of the Department of Electrical Engineering, University of Toronto.

He was elected Fellow of the Institute of Electrical and Electronics Engineers in 1991. He was also the Fellow of the Engineering Institute of Canada.

== Early life and education ==
Pasupathy was born in Chennai.

In 1963, he earned his bachelor's degree in telecommunications from the College of Engineering, Guindy, Chennai, which is currently recognized as Anna University.

He completed his M.Tech. program at the Indian Institute of Technology (IIT), Madras in 1966 and was awarded the Siemens Prize for securing the top position in his batch.

Pas received his M.Phil. and Ph.D. degrees in engineering and applied science from Yale University, located in New Haven, CT, USA, in 1970 and 1972, respectively. His doctoral research focused on Sonar and was conducted under the guidance of Professor Peter Schultheiss.

== Career ==
He worked as a research scholar and part-time lecturer at IIT, Madras, and also as a teaching assistant at Yale University. Subsequently, in 1973, he joined the faculty of the University of Toronto and eventually became a professor of electrical engineering in 1983. He spent over 35 years at the University of Toronto, where he contributed to undergraduate teaching and research.

Pas researched extensively on statistical communication theory and techniques for digital communications system design. He was the first Canadian communications professor to be listed in the "highly cited researchers" list of the ISI Web of Knowledge, indicating his wide-ranging influence in both theory and practice. He authored over 275 articles and contributions to 3 books in leading journals and conferences, and his work has been cited in over 100 patent applications.

== Area of expertise ==
Pas had expertise in several areas related to communication systems. These included developing digital communication systems that use bandwidth efficiently, applying statistical communication theory in different systems like array processing, signal processing algorithms, transceiver structures, mobile networks, and designing coding algorithms and architectures.

He was elected Fellow of the IEEE in 1991 for contributions to "bandwidth-efficient coding and modulation schemes in digital communication".

With his colleague Frank Kschischang, Pasupathy discovered the densest known lattice packing of spheres in 36 dimensions. It is known as KP36, or the Kschischang–Pasupathy lattice.

== Awards and recognitions ==
- Professional Engineer of Ontario
- Fellow of the Institute of Electrical and Electronics Engineers (IEEE), since 1991
- Canadian Award in Telecommunications Research, 2003
- Fellow of the Engineering Institute of Canada (EIC), since 2004
- Fellow of the Canadian Academy of Engineering (CAE), since 2007
- Distinguished Alumnus Award, IIT, Madras, 2010

== Selected publication ==
- Kabal, P.; Pasupathy, S. (September 1975). "Partial-Response Signaling". IEEE Transactions on Communications. 23 (9): 921–934. doi:10.1109/TCOM.1975.1092918.
- Kschischang, F.R.; Pasupathy, S. (May 1993). "Optimal nonuniform signaling for Gaussian channels". IEEE Transactions on Information Theory. 39 (3): 913–929. doi:10.1109/18.256499.
- Kohno, R.; Imai, H.; Hatori, M.; Pasupathy, S. (May 1990). "Combinations of an adaptive array antenna and a canceller of interference for direct-sequence spread-spectrum multiple-access system". IEEE Journal on Selected Areas in Communications. 8 (4): 675–682. doi:10.1109/49.54463.
- Erfanian, J.; Pasupathy, S.; Gulak, G. (February 1994). "Reduced complexity symbol detectors with parallel structure for ISI channels". IEEE Transactions on Communications. 42 (234): 1661–1671. doi:10.1109/TCOMM.1994.582868.
- Leib, H.; Pasupathy, S. (November 1988). "The phase of a vector perturbed by Gaussian noise and differentially coherent receivers". IEEE Transactions on Information Theory. 34 (6): 1491–1501. doi:10.1109/18.21288.
- Pasupathy, S. (February 1995). "Innovations-based MLSE for Rayleigh fading channels". IEEE Transactions on Communications. 43 (2/3/4): 1534–1544. doi:10.1109/26.380203.
