= Amir G. Aghdam =

Electrical engineer at Concordia University

Amir G. Aghdam is an electrical engineer and professor of electrical and computer engineering at Concordia University, Montreal. He is a fellow of the IEEE and the Engineering Institute of Canada.

== Education ==
In 2000, Aghdam obtained his PhD in electrical and computer engineering from the University of Toronto.

== Career ==
Aghdam is a professor of electrical and computer engineering at Concordia University and additionally serves as associate dean of graduate studies at the university's Gina Cody School of Engineering and Computer Science. He chairs the Conference Editorial Board of IEEE Control Systems Society and the IEEE Medals Council, as well as being editor-in-chief of the IEEE Systems Journal. Previously, he served on the Natural Sciences and Engineering Research Council of Canada ECE Evaluation Group (2014–2016) and served as the president of IEEE Canada from (2014–2015). During his time as president, he served on the IEEE's awards board. Aghdam was also a member of the IEEE's Medal of Honor committee. Aghdam was a visiting scholar at Harvard University (2015) and was an associate of the university's John A. Paulson School of Engineering and Applied Sciences (2015–2016).

== Honours ==
- IEEE MGA Achievement Award (2009)
- Fellow of the Engineering Institute of Canada (2014)
- IEEE Canada J.M. Ham Outstanding Engineering Educator Award (2020)
- Fellow of the IEEE "for research leadership in distributed control of large-scale interconnected systems" (2023)
