= Carleton School of Information Technology =

School at Carleton University

Carleton University School of Information Technology
- Type: Public
- Established: 2003
- Affiliation: Non-denominational
- Address: Azrieli Pavilion 230, Carleton University, 1125 Colonel By Drive, Ottawa, ON, K1S 5B6
- Website: www.csit.carleton.ca

Carleton School of Information Technology (CSIT) is part of the Faculty of Engineering and Design at Carleton University. CSIT, together with Algonquin College, offers a Bachelor of Information Technology degree from one of four undergraduate programs: Information Resource Management, Interactive Multimedia and Design, Network Technology, and Optical Systems and Sensors.

== History ==
In 2000, the Ontario government awarded funding for classrooms and laboratory space in the newly built Azrieli Pavilion, as well as for computing and laboratory equipment. This funding was awarded according to the provincial government's call to address the double cohort with joint programs between community colleges and universities.

In 2003, the School opened under the directorship of Dr. Ben Gianni, offering two unique programs (Network Technology, and Interactive Multimedia and Design) in partnership with Algonquin College, whereby students graduate in four years with both an advanced college diploma from Algonquin College, and a Bachelor of Information Technology from Carleton University.

In September 2005, Dorina Petriu took over directorship of the School.

In September 2006, CSIT acquired a motion capture 3D development system and a renderfarm.

In July 2009, Dr. Anthony Whitehead took over directorship of the School.

== Directorship ==
2003 - 2005: Dr. Ben Gianni

2005 - 2009: Dr. Dorina Petriu

2009 - 2017: Dr. Anthony Whitehead

2016 - 2017: Dr. Chris Smelser (Acting Director)

2017 - 2021: Dr. Chris Joslin

2022 – 2025: Dr. Robert Teather

2025 - Present: Dr. Ali Arya

== Information Resource Management program ==
Students in the Information Resource Management program develop a strong background in the cataloging, indexing, storage, presentation, analysis, and manipulation of all kinds of digital data. This program was introduced in Fall 2015.

== Interactive Multimedia and Design program ==
Students in the Interactive Multimedia and Design program develop a background in a wide range of topics such as: web development, game development, animation, 2D and 3D graphics, programming, audio and video, graphic design, and general design as it relates to each of these areas of study.

== Networking Technology program ==
Students in the Networking Technology program develop a strong background in topics related to networking, programming and computer science.

== Optical Systems and Sensors program ==
Students in the Optical Systems and Sensors program (formerly Photonics and Laser Technology) develop a strong background in light-based technologies, from optical communication to computer vision, as well as from laser technology to remote sensing. This program was introduced in Fall 2012.

== Research ==
CSIT faculty members are active in the following research areas:

=== Networking ===
Network security and Information assurance
Network architecture and applications

=== Multimedia ===
Augmented reality and displays
3D Video
Image/video processing
Collaborative virtual environment systems
Virtual reality systems (immersive and interactive)
Media adaptation
Media compression (3D/2D, Video)
Multimedia session mobility
Medical pre/intra/post-operative interfaces and displays
In-car displays and multimodal interaction
Urban and architectural planning systems
Social user interfaces
Social agents

== See also ==
- Interactive multimedia
- Bachelor of Information Technology
