= D. Jean Hutchinson =

Canadian geological engineer

D. Jean Hutchinson is a Canadian geological engineer whose research has focused on the use of lidar to characterize the structure and stability of rock masses in mines, and the risk of landslides for open pit mines, reservoirs, railways, and other infrastructure. She is a professor emerita in the Department of Geological Sciences and Geological Engineering at Queen's University at Kingston, and president of Innovative Geomechanics Inc.

At Queen's University she is a leading member of the Geomechanics and Geohazards Group which applies physical and theoretical research to matters involving Geomechanics, Geohazards, and geological engineering. This is a collaborative effort established in 2002 by the University.

== Education and career ==
Hutchinson grew up traveling the world with her father, a public transportation consultant. She has a 1984 bachelor's degree in geoengineering from the University of Toronto, a 1988 master's degree in geotechnical engineering from the University of Alberta, and a 1992 Ph.D. in rock engineering from the University of Toronto, supervised by Evert Hoek.

She worked as a professional engineer for the Ontario Ministry of Transportation and as a consultant, before returning to academia as a faculty member at the University of Waterloo, and then at Queen's University. As a professor at Queen's University, she headed the Department of Geological Sciences and Geological Engineering from 2009 to 2017.

== Recognition ==
Hutchinson was named a 2011 fellow of the Engineering Institute of Canada and Canadian Geotechnical Society. The Canadian Geotechnical Society gave her their 2001 A. G. Stermac Award, their 2003 John A. Franklin Award, their 2011 R. M. Quigley Award, their 2013 Thomas Roy Award, and their 2016 Robert Schuster Medal, "for her significant contribution to geohazards research, development and awareness in North America". The Engineering Institute of Canada gave her their 2017 Canadian Pacific Railway Medal, and their 2024 John B. Stirling Medal for leadership and distinguished service at the national level.

She was the 2019 Glossop Medal Lecturer of the Geological Society of London, the second Canadian to be awarded this medal. She was the 2024 recipient of the Trailblazer Award of Women in Mining Canada.

She was elected to the Canadian Academy of Engineering in 2020.
