= Frank Kschischang =

German-Canadian electrical engineer (born 1962)

- Born: 15 September 1962 (age 63); Mettmann, West Germany
- Education: University of British Columbia; University of Toronto
- Scientific career
- Fields: Electrical Engineering
- Institutions: University of Toronto
- Thesis: Shaping and Coding Gain Criteria in Signal Constellation Design (1991)
- Doctoral advisor: Subbarayan Pasupathy
- Website: www.comm.utoronto.ca/~frank/

Frank Robert Kschischang (born 15 September 1962) is a German-born Canadian electrical engineer and a professor in the Department of Electrical and Computer Engineering at the University of Toronto, and holds a Canada Research Chair in communication algorithms.

== Education and career ==
Kschischang was born in Mettmann of North Rhine-Westphalia in Germany and moved to Canada at the age of two. He studied at the University of British Columbia, where he received his B.A.Sc. in 1985 and then at the University of Toronto, where he received his PhD in electrical engineering under the supervision of Subbarayan Pasupathy in 1991. From the late 1990s till early 2000s, Kschischang and Brendan Frey co-invented factor graph, a kind of graphical model used in Bayesian inference.

Kschischang became a Fellow of the IEEE for his "contributions to trellis structures, graphical models and iterative decoding techniques for error-correcting codes." He is also a Fellow of the Engineering Institute of Canada, and is a recipient of the 2010 Killam Research Fellowship. He received the 2023 IEEE Richard W. Hamming Medal, the 2012 Canadian Award for Telecommunications Research, and the 2016 Aaron D. Wyner Distinguished Service Award. From 2014 to 2016, Kschischang served as Editor-in-Chief of the IEEE Transactions on Information Theory.
