= Marvin Girouard =

Marvin Girouard was the chief executive officer and chairman of the board of Pier 1 Imports. He was elected CEO in 1998, elected chairman of the board in 1999 and left the company in February 2007. He is credited with saving Pier 1 Imports from its sales slump in the 1990s. Under Girouard's stewardship, Pier 1 Imports' sales reached $1 billion in the fiscal year 1999.
