= Dorina Petriu =

Canadian software engineer

Dorina Corina Petriu is a Romanian and Canadian software engineer and a distinguished research professor emerita in the Department of Systems and Computer Engineering at Carleton University. She is known for her research on software performance engineering using the Unified Modeling Language.

== Education and career ==
Petriu received a diploma in computer engineering from the Politehnica University of Timișoara, and a doctorate in electrical engineering from Carleton University.

She taught at the Politehnica University of Timișoara, at Oran 1 University in Algeria, and at the Université du Québec, before taking a permanent position at Carleton University. At Carleton, she was named Chancellor's Professor in 2015.

Petriu is a coauthor of the book Model-Driven Dependability Assessment of Software Systems (with Simona Bernardi and Jose Merseguer, Springer, 2013).

Petriu was elected as a Fellow of the Engineering Institute of Canada in 2005, and as a Fellow of the Canadian Academy of Engineering in 2010.
