= Professional Engineers Ontario =

Canadian regulatory body

Professional Engineers Ontario (PEO; known until 1993 as the Association of Professional Engineers of Ontario, APEO) is a self-regulatory body that licenses and governs Ontario's professional engineers.

PEO was created on June 15, 1922. It has a statutory mandate under the Professional Engineers Act of Ontario to protect the public interest. It is also mandated to educate its members about latest developments in engineering and maintaining a Code of Ethics. Licensed professional engineers use the postnominal P.Eng.

PEO consists of 36 chapters, each representing a different geographic area in Ontario. PEO is governed by a Council of 29 members, of which 17 are elected by the licence holders and 12 are appointed by the provincial government.

The organization has collaborated with the Ontario Society of Professional Engineers since 1947 in organizing the Ontario Professional Engineers Awards (OPEA).

== Performance Audit ==
An external performance audit by Professional Standards Authority (UK) in July 2019 found PEO met only 8 out of 22 performance standards. It partially met an additional 3 standards. The audit was commissioned due to "concern that PEO was not sufficiently focused on its mandate to protect the public."

The audit was most critical of PEO's licensing and registration processes, for which it met only 1 out 7 performance standards. The audit found PEO's "approach to licensing is complicated, that it results in long delays for some, particularly international applicants and that it is open to a charge of inconsistency and unfairness." It further proposed "the discriminatory aspects of written examinations, a Canadian year of experience and face to face interviews should be discarded."

== Institutional Racism ==
In 2020 PEO commissioned an assessment on racism and discrimination risks, which was completed by independent consultants with legal expertise, Patricia DeGuire and Shashu Clacken. Patricia DeGuire is the current Chief Commissioner of the Ontario Human Rights Commission, having been appointed in 2021.The assessment found widespread perception of racism in licensing process, disciplinary process and governance. The assessment proposed PEO collect race-based data to further investigate racial disparities.

The investigators reported: "interviewees told us of their perceptions that racialized persons are over-represented among: (i) unsuccessful applicants; (ii) applicants who are assigned the highest number of exams; (iii) applicants whose licensure experience takes unduly long; and (iv) licensees who face discipline, among other perceived denials of benefits or impositions of burdens."

The investigators also heard "that there are significant issues of exclusion at several of the PEO’s chapters." The investigators also observed "almost all interviewees demonstrated a degree of fear" speaking to them, noting "almost every interviewee urged us at their interview, sometimes multiple times, for assurances of anonymity."

Council accepted the report stating they believe they "have a strong foundation of progressive policies and processes in place". In 2022, PEO adopted an anti-racism code, committing to collect race and identity based data and to better meet its human rights obligations.

In 2023, PEO membership elected president-elect for the 2024-2025 term, Greg Wowchuk, who proposed a motion in 2019 to celebrate the contributions of Europeans in Ontario.

== PEO Council ==
The Professional Engineers Ontario Council consists of both elected professional engineers and "members appointed by the office of the Attorney General of Ontario". A president is elected each year, who is president-elect for one year, president for one year (see list below), and then past president for one year, serving for a total of three years on the PEO governing council.

== Presidents ==
2022-23 Nick Colucci

2021-22 Christian Bellini

2020-21 Marisa Sterling

2019-2020 Nancy Hill

2018 David Brown

2017 R.D. (Bob) Dony

2016 George Comrie

2015 Thomas Chong

2014 J. David Adams

2013 Annette Bergeron

2012 Denis Dixon

2011 J. David Adams

2010 Diane L. Freeman

2009 Catherine Karakatsanis

2008 David Adams

2007 Walter Bilanski

2006 Patrick Quinn

2005 Robert (Bob) Goodings

2004 George Comrie

2003 Ken McMartin

2002 Richard W. Braddock

2001 G. Gordon M. Sterling

2000 Peter M. DeVita
