= Chebucto =

Chebucto may refer to:

== Geography ==
- A Mi'kmaq word for Halifax Harbour in Nova Scotia, Canada, meaning "Chief Harbour" or "big harbour"; rendered in Mi'kmaq orthography as Kjipuktuk
- Chebucto Head, Nova Scotia, a headland in Nova Scotia
- Chebucto Lake, northern Ontario
- Chebucto Peninsula, Nova Scotia

== Ships ==
- Point Chebucto, a tug built at Halifax Shipyard
- Chebucto (ferry), a former ferry in Halifax Harbour

== Other ==
- Halifax Chebucto, an electoral district
- Chebucto Community Network
