= St. John's International Airport =

Airport in St. John's, Newfoundland and Labrador, Canada

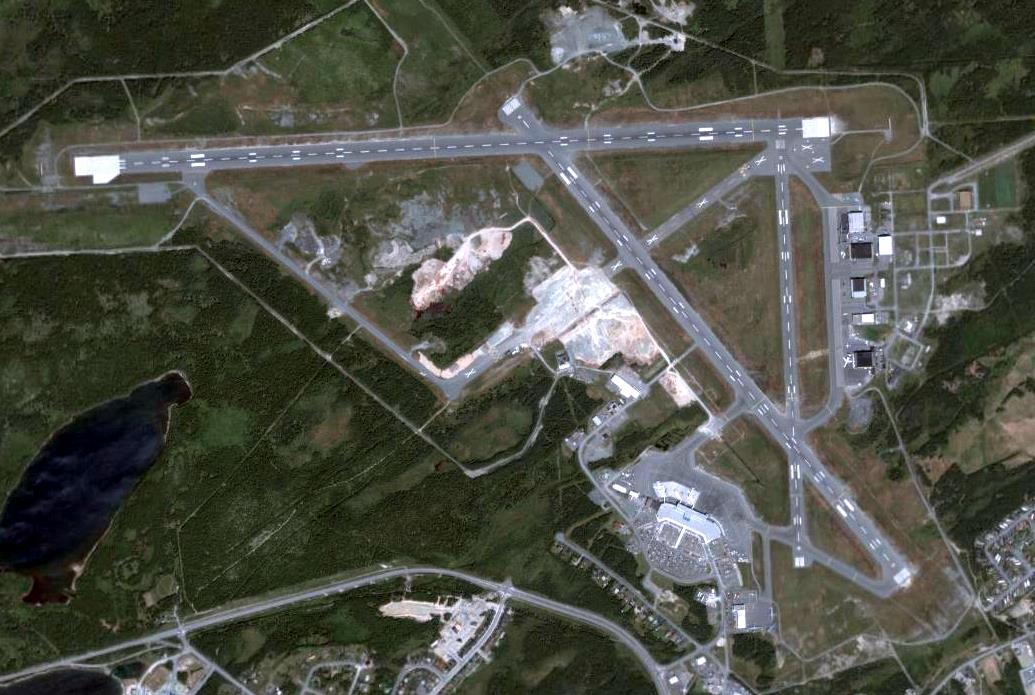
- IATA: YYT; ICAO: CYYT; WMO: 71801

Summary
- Airport type: Public
- Owner: Transport Canada
- Operator: St. John's International Airport Authority Inc.
- Serves: St. John's metropolitan area; Avalon Peninsula
- Location: St. John's, Newfoundland and Labrador, Canada
- Focus city for: WestJet
- Operating base for: Cougar Helicopters; PAL Airlines
- Time zone: NST (UTC−03:30)
  - Summer (DST): NDT (UTC−02:30)
- Elevation AMSL: 461 ft (141 m)
- Coordinates: 47°37′07″N 052°45′09″W
- Website: www.stjohnsairport.com

Maps
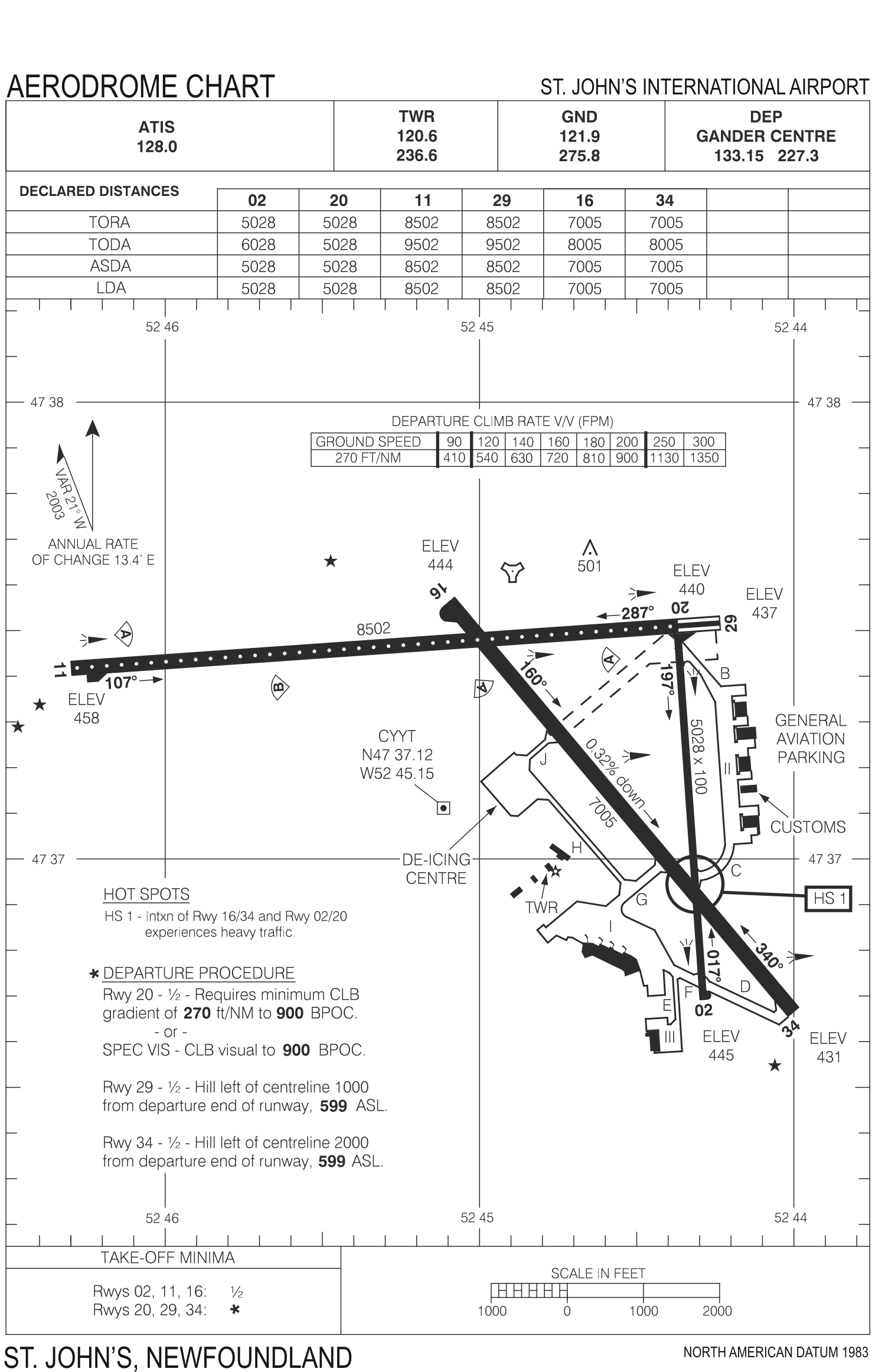
- Transport Canada airport diagram

- Location in Newfoundland and Labrador

Runways
Direction	Length		Surface
Direction	ft	m	Surface
10/28	8,502	2,591	Asphalt
16/34	7,005	2,135	Asphalt

Helipads
Number	Length		Surface
Number	ft	m	Surface
Cougar 1	82	25	Asphalt
Cougar 2	82	25	Asphalt
PAL 1	68	21	Asphalt
PAL 2	68	21	Asphalt
Woodward	65	20	Asphalt

Statistics (2025)
- Total Passengers: 1,410,000
- Sources: Canada Flight Supplement; Environment Canada; Movements from Statistics Canada; Passengers from SJIAA

St. John's International Airport (IATA: YYT, ICAO: CYYT) is located 3 nautical miles (5.6 km; 3.5 mi) northwest of St. John's, Newfoundland and Labrador, Canada. It serves the St. John's metropolitan area and the Avalon Peninsula. The airport is part of the National Airports System, and is operated by St. John's International Airport Authority Inc.

Designated as an international airport by Transport Canada it is classified as an airport of entry by Nav Canada and is staffed by the Canada Border Services Agency (CBSA). CBSA officers at this airport can handle aircraft with no more than 165 passengers. However, they can handle up to 450 if the aircraft is unloaded in stages.

== History ==
=== World War II ===
Concern was expressed in the Canadian Parliament as early as September 1939 for the security of the Dominion of Newfoundland (which was not yet a part of Canada) in the event of a German raid or attack. It was felt that a permanent airfield defense facility was needed and as a result discussions were carried out among Canada, Newfoundland and the United Kingdom during 1940. In late 1940 the Canadian Government agreed to construct an air base near St. John's. Early in 1941, Canadian Prime Minister William Lyon Mackenzie King informed Newfoundland Governor Sir Humphrey T. Walwyn of the intended location in Torbay. Newfoundland agreed, but stipulated that Canada was to assume all expenses and that the aerodrome not be used for civil purposes without first receiving Newfoundland's permission. The Canadian Government agreed, and in April 1941 McNamara Construction Company began construction on the runway. At a cost of approximately $1.5 million, a pair of runways, taxiways, aprons, hangars and other facilities were built and in operation by the end of 1941. The Royal Canadian Air Force (RCAF) officially opened Torbay Airport on 15 December 1941. It was jointly used by the RCAF, Royal Air Force (RAF), and the United States Army Air Corps until December 1946.

On 18 October 1941, three American B-17 Flying Fortress and one RCAF Digby made the first unofficial landings on the only serviceable runway available. Later that month a British Overseas Airways Corporation B-24 Liberator en route from Prestwick, Scotland, to Gander, made the first sanctioned landing during a weather emergency. The first commercial air service at the facility went into operation on 1 May 1942, with the arrival at Torbay of a Trans-Canada Air Lines Lockheed Lodestar aircraft with five passengers and three crew. The first terminal building at the site was constructed in 1943. The small wooden structure was replaced by a larger brick building in 1958.

==== Aerodrome ====
In approximately 1942 the aerodrome was listed as RCAF Aerodrome – Torbay, Newfoundland at 47°37′N 52°44′W with a variation of 29 degrees west and elevation of 460 ft (140 m). The field was listed as "all hard surfaced" and had three runways listed as follows:

Runway name	Length	Width	Surface
8/26	5,000 ft (1,500 m)	150 ft (46 m)	Hard surfaced
17/35	5,000 ft (1,500 m)	200 ft (61 m)	Hard surfaced
2/20	5,000 ft (1,500 m)	150 ft (46 m)	Hard surfaced

=== 107 Rescue Unit RCAF ===
In 1954 a rescue unit was established, 107 Rescue Unit, by the RCAF to replace the existing detachment of the 103 Rescue Unit. It would remain here until 1964.

107 Rescue Unit hosted a few different aircraft to perform search and rescue operations:

- Canso-A (1)
- Noorduyn Norseman (1)
- Avro Lancaster (2) – replaced by North Star in 1963
- Canadair North Star (2) – replaced Lancasters in 1963

=== Post war ===
Although the airfield was not used as much as Argentia, Gander, Stephenville and Goose Bay airports in the movement of large numbers of aircraft to England, it was still quite busy. The Royal Air Force had its own squadron of fighters, surveillance and weather aircraft stationed there. The RCAF personnel strength on the station during the peak war years was well over 2000. Through an agreement between the US, Canadian and Newfoundland governments early in 1947, the United States Air Force (USAF) took over the use of the airport facilities and used about ten of the airport buildings. The US Military Air Transport Service (MATS) needed Torbay Airport in order to complete its assigned mission at that time. Maintenance of the airport and facilities was done by the Canadian Department of Transport.

On 1 April 1946, the airport became a civilian operation under the jurisdiction of the Canadian Department of Transport. Confusion was caused by the presence of American military personnel at a civilian airport operated by the Canadian government in a foreign country. Consequently, on 1 April 1953 control was returned to the Department of National Defence. On 15 April 1953, the RCAF Station at Torbay was reactivated and RCAF personnel started to move in and to provide the necessary administration and operation of the facility to support the mission of its co-tenant, the USAF. In early 1954 a rental agreement was signed between the USAF and the RCAF, and the USAF acquired use of additional buildings.

The control tower constructed during the war burned down in an extensive fire on 16 March 1946, which caused $1.5 million worth of damage. Construction was not begun on a new tower until 1951; it was opened in June 1952. A new Tower/Communications Building replaced that structure in March 1976. The tower was equipped with radio navigation and landing aids including precision approach radar, non-directional beacon and VHF omni-directional range.

The Transport Department maintained control over the terminal building. The facility remained RCAF Station Torbay until 1 April 1964, when it was returned to the jurisdiction of the Transport Department under the name St. John's Airport.

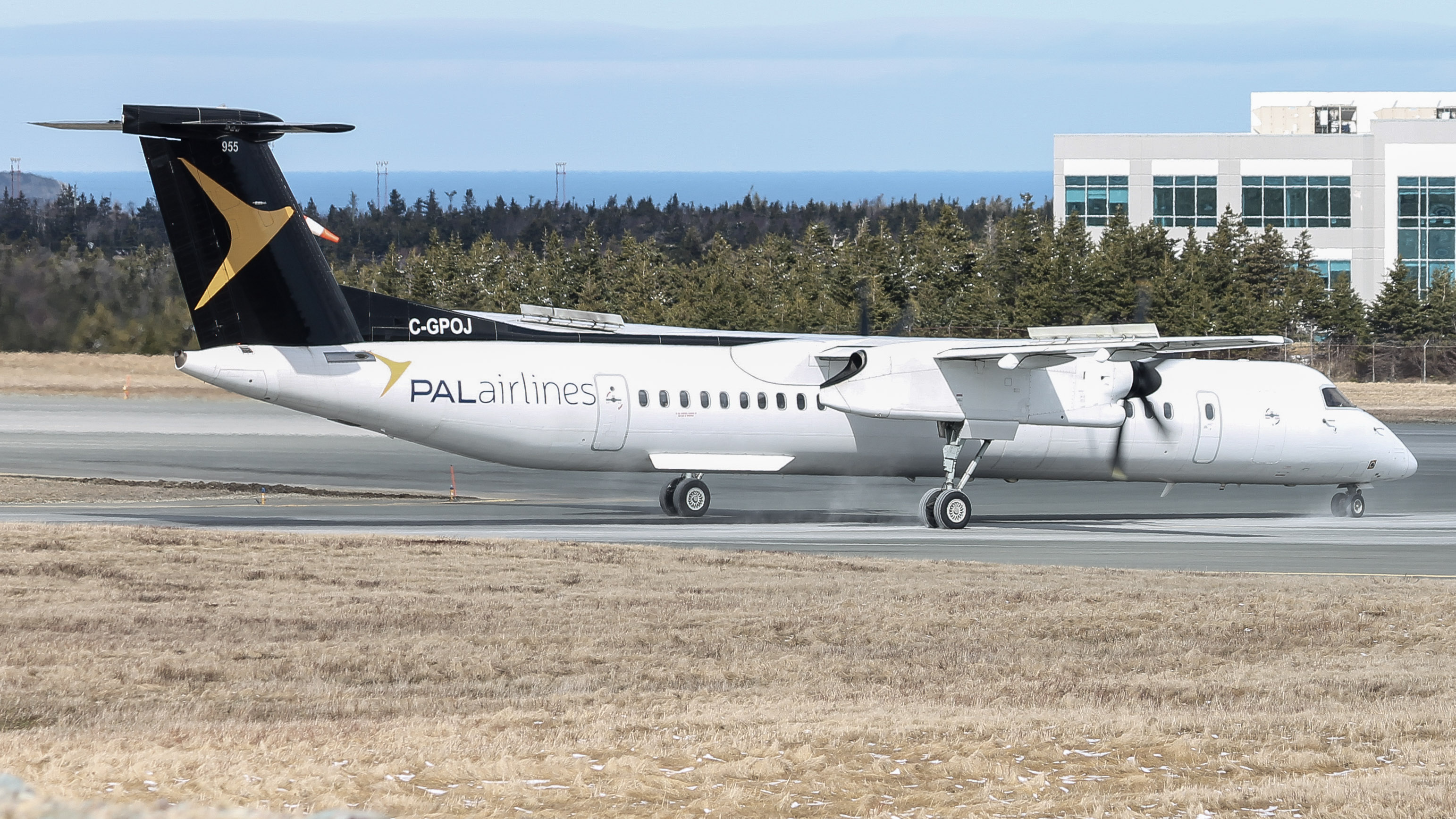
A PAL Airlines Dash 8-400 lining up for a runway 34 departure at CYYT

St. John's Airport is still commonly referred to as "Torbay" within the aviation community. For example, in aeronautical radio communications, air traffic controllers, flight dispatchers and pilots refer to the weather in "Torbay" and in flight clearances controllers commonly clear aircraft to or over St. John's with the phrase "Cleared direct Torbay". In the latter case this is a clearance to the VOR (VHF beacon) serving the region, which continues to be named Torbay on all official aeronautical charts. In addition to tradition, this usage avoids confusion with Saint John, New Brunswick, also in Atlantic Canada. Additionally the "T" in airport codes CYYT and YYT continues to reflect the Torbay origin.

=== Terminal and renovations ===
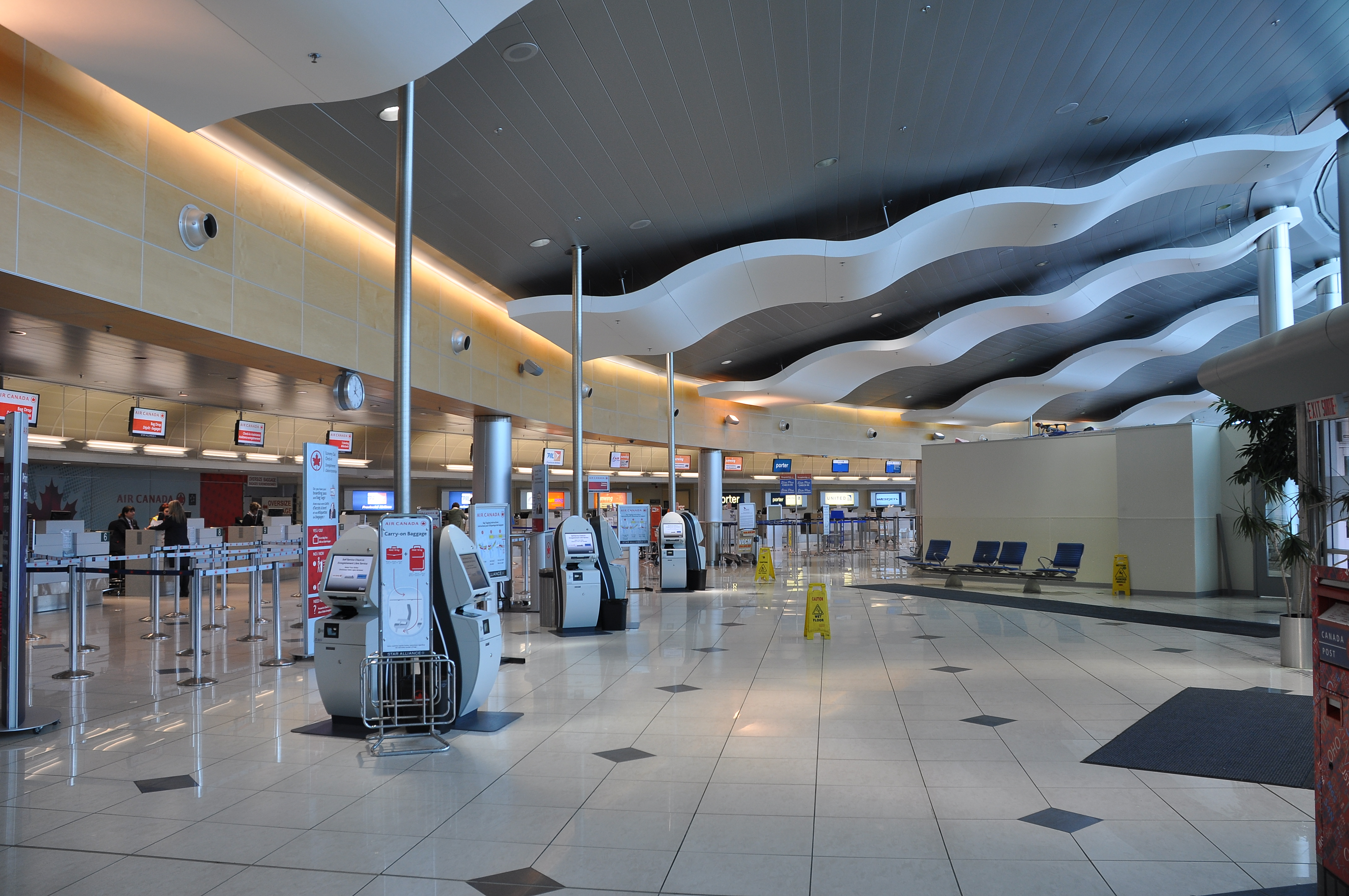
Check-in areas in St. John's airport

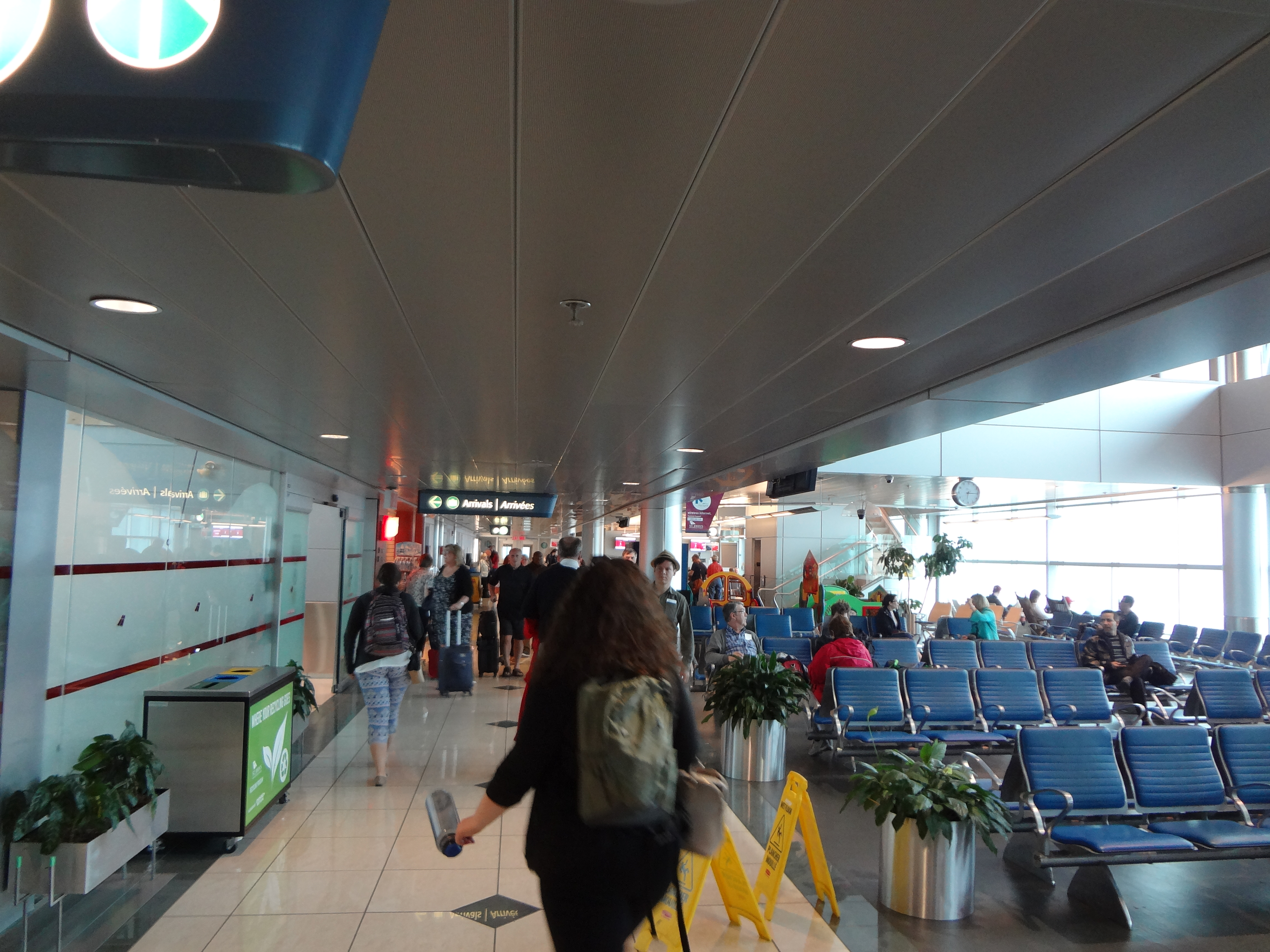
St. John's International airport arrivals area, Newfoundland and Labrador exit from the luggage carousel

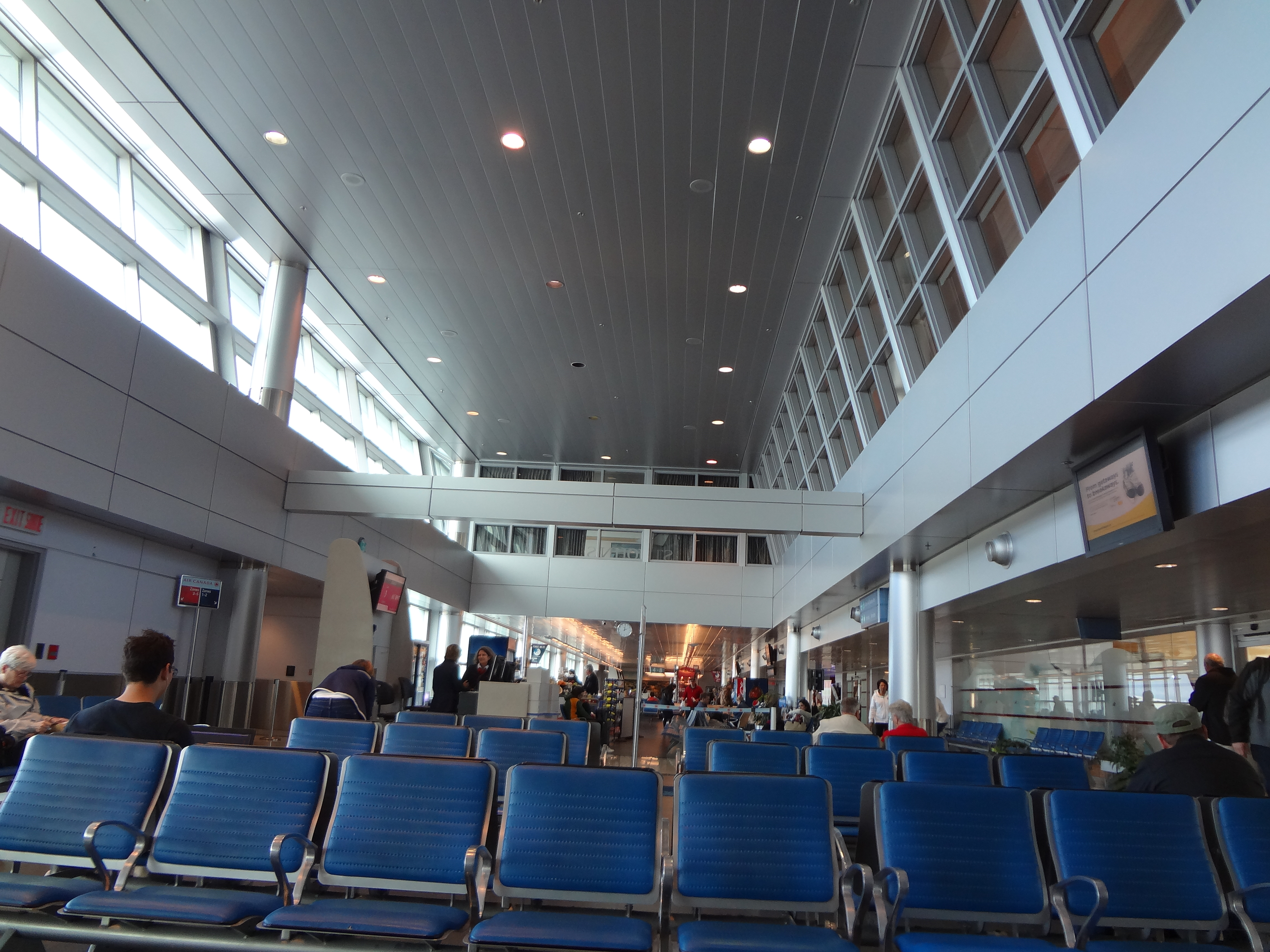
Departure lounge at St. John’s International Airport

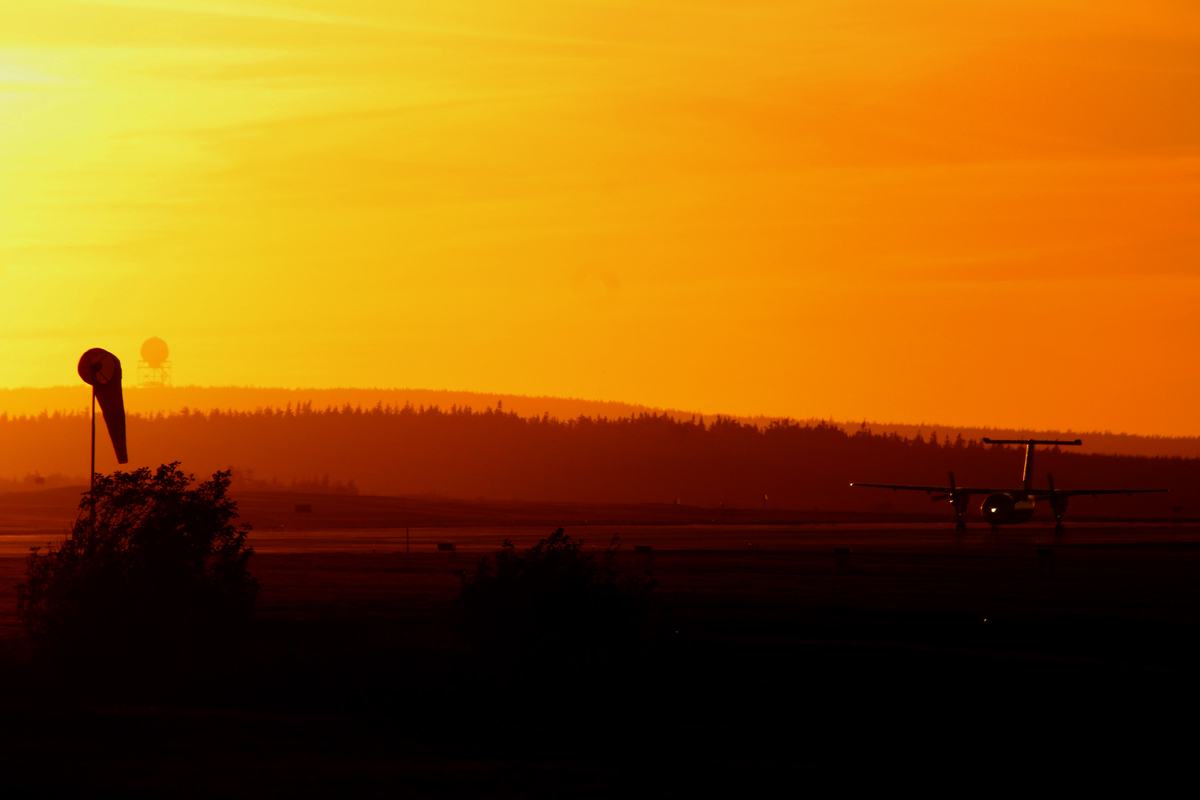
Provincial Airlines Dash-8 sunset landing

In 1981 the terminal building housed the offices of the airport manager and staff. There were ticket offices for Eastern Provincial Airways, Air Canada, Gander Aviation and Labrador Airways, a large waiting area, a secure departure lounge, a self-serve restaurant, a licensed lounge, a number of food concessions and car rental facilities. In 1981 a small museum was prepared to house the story of aviation in Newfoundland and related memorabilia. Air Canada started flying to London, UK, from St. John's instead of Gander in April 1986.

The airport underwent a $50 million renovation in 2002. The air terminal was completely renovated, expanded and modernized to meet the standards of other airport terminals its size across North America. The airport has undergone more renovations since then and plans are in place to prepare 300 acres (1.2 km^{2}) of land to build an industrial park adjacent to the airport.

The airport was designated as one of five Canadian airports suitable as an emergency landing site for the Space Shuttle orbiter.

In May 2006, Air Canada announced it would terminate its flight to London's Heathrow Airport later that year. Many Newfoundland residents, including the mayor of St. John's, decried the decision, leading Air Canada to resume the route seasonally in April 2007. In May 2007, Astraeus Airlines introduced year-round service to London's Gatwick Airport aboard a Boeing 737. The flight ended three months later; most people had opted to fly Air Canada to London. In September 2007, Air Canada also ceased its London route, leaving Newfoundland without any flights to Europe for the first time since World War II.

Air Canada restarted seasonal flights to London-Heathrow in May 2010. The company employed an Airbus A319 on the route. In 2014, Air Canada began flying year-round to London. It later started operating the flight with a Boeing 737 MAX. The airline suspended the link after the plane was grounded in March 2019.

== Airlines and destinations ==
=== Passenger ===
Airlines	Destinations
Air Canada	Montréal–Trudeau, Toronto–Pearson
Air Canada Express	Halifax
Air Saint-Pierre	Saint-Pierre
Flair Airlines	Seasonal: Toronto–Pearson
PAL Airlines	Deer Lake, Gander, Goose Bay, Halifax, St. Anthony, Wabush
Porter Airlines	Halifax, Hamilton (ON), Ottawa, Toronto–Pearson; Seasonal: Montréal–MET
WestJet	Calgary; Seasonal: Cancún, Dublin, Edmonton, London–Gatwick, Montego Bay, Paris–Charles de Gaulle, Punta Cana, Tampa, Toronto–Pearson, Winnipeg

=== Helicopter services ===
Airlines	Destinations
Cougar Helicopters	Hebron–Ben Nevis, Hibernia, SeaRose, Terra Nova

Fixed-base operators based at St. John's International Airport are Provincial Airlines and Cougar Helicopters.

== Statistics ==
=== Annual traffic ===
Annual passenger traffic
Year	Passengers	% change
2010	1,318,713	Steady
2011	1,371,461	▲4%
2012	1,453,749	▲6%
2013	1,497,361	▲3%
2014	1,561,748	▲4.3%
2015	1,483,660	▼ -5%
2016	1,547,358	▲4.3%
2017	1,520,500	▼ -1.7%
2018	1,483,650	▼ -2.4%
2019	1,435,013	▼ -3.4%
2020	358,000	▼ -75%
2021	459,000	▲28%
2022	1,099,392	▲130%
2023	1,260,000	▲17.4%
2024	1,380,000	▲9.5%
2025	1,410,000	▲2.2%

== Fire and rescue ==
St. John's International Airport Emergency Services is responsible for fire and rescue needs at the airport. Apparatus and crew are housed in a single fire station is located within the Combined Services Building.

== Accidents and incidents ==
- On 12 March 2009, Cougar Helicopters Flight 91, a Sikorsky S-92A departed St. John's and ditched about 71 km (44 mi) east of St. John's, The helicopter was en route to the SeaRose FPSO in the White Rose oil field and Hibernia Platform in the Hibernia oil field. Of the eighteen on board, only one survived.
- On 24 March 2023, a fire at St. John's International Airport shut down the terminal building. The airport authority said the fire began on the second floor of the terminal at around 11:30 p.m. The following day, the terminal was reopened to the public around 5:00 pm.
- On 1 May 2024, a PAL Airlines Dash 8-400 overran runway 10 upon arrival from Halifax Stanfield International Airport. The visibility at the time of the incident was very poor. All passengers and crew survived with no injuries, and the aircraft sustained minimal damage.
- On 29 April 2025, an Air Tractor AT-802, carrying one person, departed St. John's, and was en route to Santa Maria in the Azores. An oil slick, pontoon, and empty life raft were found, as well as a debris field. Despite extensive search efforts, including fishing vessels and aircraft from PAL Aerospace, 103 Search and Rescue Squadron, and Cougar Helicopters, the pilot was not found and the search was called off.

== See also ==
- St. John's (Paddys Pond) Water Aerodrome
