= Cougar Helicopters Flight 91 =

2009 helicopter accident in Atlantic Ocean

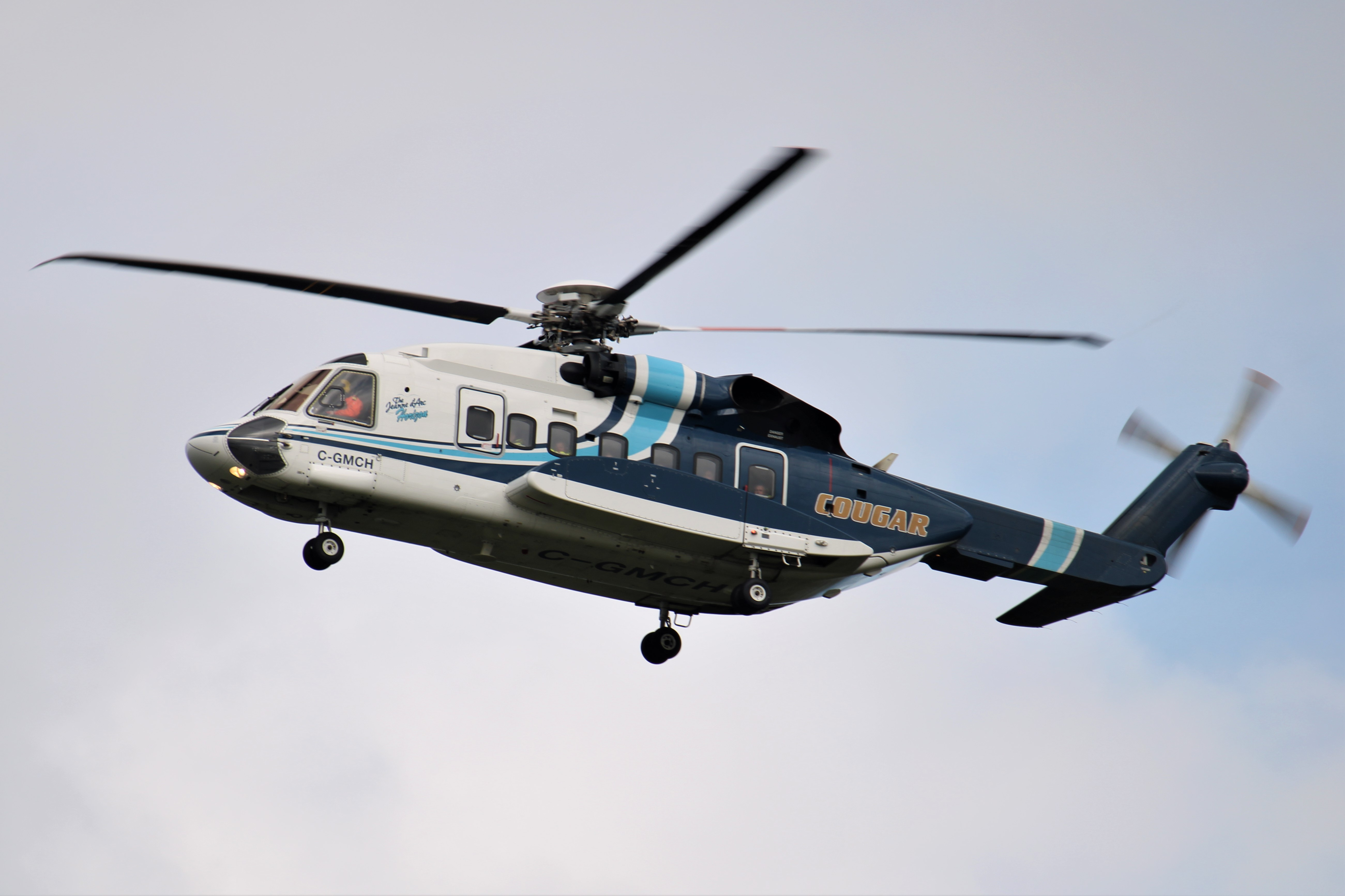
- A Cougar Helicopters Sikorsky S-92A, similar to the one involved in the accident

Accident
- Date: 12 March 2009
- Summary: Main gearbox malfunction leading to collision with water
- Site: Atlantic Ocean off Newfoundland, Canada; 47°26′05″N 51°56′58″W

Aircraft
- Aircraft type: Sikorsky S-92A
- Operator: Cougar Helicopters
- ICAO flight No.: CHI91
- Call sign: COUGAR 91
- Registration: C-GZCH
- Flight origin: St. John's International Airport
- Destination: SeaRose FPSO
- Occupants: 18
- Passengers: 16
- Crew: 2
- Fatalities: 17
- Injuries: 1
- Survivors: 1

Cougar Helicopters Flight 91 was a scheduled flight of a Cougar Sikorsky S-92A, which ditched on 12 March 2009 en route to the SeaRose FPSO in the White Rose oil field and Hibernia Platform in the Hibernia oilfield off the coast of Newfoundland 55 kilometres (34 mi) east-southeast of St. John's, Newfoundland. Of the 18 aboard, only one survived.

== Aircraft ==
The 2006-built Sikorsky S-92A, with serial number 920048, was a 19-passenger helicopter powered by twin General Electric CT7-8A turboshaft engines. It had been registered C-GZCH to Cougar International Inc. since 12 April 2007. The main gearbox, which was reported as having lost oil pressure, couples both engines to the main and tail rotors, and also drives the hydraulic pumps and two electrical generators.

== Flight ==
Cougar 91 is a regular 90-minute, 315 km shuttle flight from St. John's International Airport, usually servicing the SeaRose FPSO. The flight was carrying workers to SeaRose and the Hibernia platform. The flight was under the command of Matthew Davis (34), with Tim Lanouette (47), as first officer.

A mayday call was issued after the aircraft reported zero oil pressure in the main gearbox at 9:40 a.m. NDT (12:10 UTC). Flight 91 attempted to return to St. John's but went down at 9:48 a.m. Before the impact, the pilot accidentally transmitted intra-cockpit dialogue encouraging his co-pilot to ditch while the sounds of the engine failure is heard in the background. The conversation recorded was: "There you go, you got it, you got it, you got it. OK, its [inaudible], you're doing good," before the sound of impact is heard. The aircraft was spotted, floating upside down, by a Provincial Airlines ice patrol airplane 25 minutes later. It later sank in 178 metres (584 ft) of water. Only one of the eighteen people aboard survived the sinking, although another managed to exit the aircraft.. All the 17 victims died of drowning.

== Search and rescue ==
Weather conditions were reported as "good", with the water at 0 °C (32 °F), waves at 2–3 metres (7–10 ft), and winds at 37 kilometres per hour (23 mph). The normal practice on these flights is to wear immersion suits for hypothermia protection. Survival times for adult men wearing the immersion suits in these conditions are estimated at 24 hours, but no signals had been received from the suit locator beacons. All passengers on these flights are required to have taken a five-day escape and survival course within the past three years, but escape from a ditched helicopter is difficult even when put down gently.

Eighteen people were on board the helicopter. The sole survivor was flown to hospital at St. John's in critical but stable condition with fractures and with salt water in his lungs. One woman was found dead on the surface. Two life rafts were found empty. The Canadian Coast Guard, Canadian Forces, and Provincial Airlines aircraft and surface vessels continued to search the area for additional survivors.

== Investigation ==
The investigation was led by the Transportation Safety Board of Canada (TSB), which assigned an initial team of twelve investigators, and the Royal Canadian Mounted Police. As the state of manufacture, the United States was represented by eight investigators, from the National Transportation Safety Board, assisted by the FAA and Sikorsky.

=== Recovery phase ===
The TSB used two remotely operated vehicles (ROVs), operating from Atlantic Osprey, to locate and examine the sunken aircraft, which was found on the bottom largely intact but with significant structural damage, and with the tail boom broken off and lying separately nearby. The damage to the airframe was severe enough to prevent immediate recovery of the wreckage as originally planned, and efforts instead focused on recovering the remains of the passengers and crew. Images from the ROVs indicated the presence of between 10 and 13 bodies in the aircraft fuselage. Nine bodies were recovered from the wreckage on 14–15 March and were returned to St. John's in the early hours of 16 March aboard Atlantic Osprey. On 17 March, the TSB announced that all bodies had been recovered, as had the Flight Data Recorder (FDR) and Cockpit Voice Recorder (CVR). The S-92 FDR/CVR is one box called a Multi-Purpose Flight Recorder, commonly referred to as a "combi-unit", manufactured by Penny and Giles in the United Kingdom. The FDR/CVR was transferred to Ottawa, Ontario for analysis by TSB personnel. On 18 March Atlantic Osprey docked in St. John's carrying the main chassis of the helicopter in a basket on deck. The TSB's lead investigator indicated on 19 March that about 80% of the wreckage had already been recovered; by 26 March this figure had been increased to 95%.

=== Inspection, analysis, and recommendations ===
TSB identified a broken titanium stud as part of the gearbox oil filter assembly. Sikorsky had previously recommended that the titanium stud be replaced with a steel stud within one year or 1,250 flight hours of a 28 January 2009 Alert Service Bulletin, following a total loss of oil and emergency landing in Australia in August 2008. On 21 March Les Dorr, a spokesman for the FAA, indicated that it would release an Airworthiness Directive calling for the replacement of the studs on other S-92A aircraft, most likely on Monday 23 March, but that the directive would apply only to US-registered helicopters. The FAA had issued previous Airworthiness Directives: AD 2005-12-03, AD 2006-11-14, and AD 2006-15-19 for problems with the main gearbox of that type. The FAA had also issued Special Airworthiness Information Bulletin (SAIB) number SW-09-19 Sikorsky S92A Main Gearbox Emergency Procedures dated 19 March 2009. The SAIB indicated that a recent procedural change, Sikorsky Safety Advisory (SSA) SSA-S92-08-006, dated 26 September 2008 may not have been appropriate and that it had not been approved. The European Aviation Safety Agency had already acted to highlight this problem.

Late on 23 March, Sikorsky issued a news release indicating that it had furnished replacement studs and tools to all operators and that 50 of 91 aircraft had been reworked already. The FAA later grounded flights until the parts had been replaced, issuing Emergency Airworthiness Directive 2009-07-53 dated 23 March that required the replacement of the studs before further flight. TSB disclosed at a news conference on 26 March that the flight data record indicated that oil pressure had been lost, but that there was no anomaly other than the broken stud to explain that loss. The aircraft descended at 1,000 feet per minute (5.1 m/s). The aircraft lost electrical power, interrupting the data record. Damage analysis indicated that it struck the water belly-down and tail first with an acceleration of 20 g.

In 2003, the S-92A initially failed a FAR/JAR-29 additional oil system loss of lubrication test (sometimes called the "run dry" test) conducted to determine whether it could sustain 30-minute operation without main gearbox lubrication, failing after 10 minutes. Subsequent design changes implemented an oil cooler bypass valve to eliminate what were seen to be the most likely sources of leakage, the cooler and external lines and fittings. Certification was obtained without meeting the 30-minute test as the chances of oil loss were calculated as being "extremely remote", a statistical chance of failure of approximately one in every 10 million flight hours. This was based on the erroneous assumption that all leaks would occur from the oil cooler, and so did not represent the type of leak that occurred to Flight 91 or to a CHC S-92A in Australia the previous year.

All offshore helicopter flights from St. John's were suspended following the accident. Regular passenger flights to the platforms resumed on Monday, 18 May 2009; Cougar Helicopters is limiting the maximum altitude for passenger flights to 2,133.6 metres (7,000 ft) as an additional safety precaution. On 16 June 2009, the FAA released an additional Airworthiness Directive, AD 2009-13-01, requiring the Rotorcraft Flight Manual for the S-92A helicopter be modified to clarify emergency procedures in the event of a main gearbox failure due to loss of oil pressure, and in particular to identify the urgency of an immediate landing in the event of an oil pressure loss.

The TSB issued an update on the investigation on 18 June 2009, indicating that the pilot may have been trying to perform a controlled landing at the time of the accident. The main blades were apparently rotating at the time of impact; however, the tail rotor drive gears were severely damaged, which would result in a loss of thrust. An engine shutdown was initiated at an altitude of 500 feet (150 m), consistent with a tail rotor drive failure. The TSB was continuing to investigate the failure of the flotation system, which reportedly had been activated but did not operate correctly.

The Inquiry Commissioner took some interim measures to secure improved emergency response times in the North West Atlantic pending completion of the Commission's Report. On 23 October 2009, the European Aviation Safety Agency issued an airworthiness directive in response to the discovery of cracks in the mounting bolts of the main gearbox of S-92 helicopters operating in the North Sea.

On 9 February 2011, the Transportation Safety Board released its final report on the accident, where it was established that the accident was caused by various factors (16) separated from each other that led to the fatal crash but no single one was to blame.

== Inquiry and lawsuit ==
In June 2009, the sole survivor and the families of the 15 passengers who died in the accident filed a U.S lawsuit against Sikorsky and its subsidiary Keystone Helicopter Corporation. On 14 July, the complainants announced that they had "voluntarily discontinued" legal action "to engage in alternative dispute resolution before further litigation". On 5 January 2010, lawyers for Sikorsky announced that an out-of-court settlement had been reached with the survivor and the families of the victims of the crash. The details of the settlement were not disclosed due to confidentiality agreements.

A public Commission of Inquiry into the accident (the Offshore Helicopter Safety Inquiry), headed by retired Newfoundland and Labrador Supreme Court judge Robert Wells, began hearings in Newfoundland on 19 October 2009. Robert Decker, the survivor of the accident, gave testimony at the inquiry in early November. The families of the victims of the accident, as well as lawyers representing the estates of the pilots, were allowed to ask questions at the inquiry. The Inquiry delivered its Phase I report to the Canada-Newfoundland and Labrador Offshore Petroleum Board on 17 November 2010. Phase II of the report was delivered to the C-NLOPB on 15 August 2011.

In June 2010, Cougar Helicopters and its insurer filed a lawsuit against the aircraft manufacturer (Sikorsky), requesting more than $25 million in damages. The lawsuit alleged that Sikorsky "fraudulently misrepresented" the ability of the S-92 helicopter to run for 30 minutes after losing oil pressure, and further failed to notify operators of the severity of a similar incident in Australia in 2008. Sikorsky had argued to move the legal proceedings to Connecticut, but this move was denied by the Newfoundland and Labrador Court of Appeal on 4 July 2010, and the case proceeded in court in St. John's. The lawsuit against Sikorsky was settled out of court in November 2011; the details of the settlement were not disclosed by either party.

== Casualties ==
Pilot Matthew William Thomas Davis, 34, of St. John's, Newfoundland and Labrador, and First Officer Timothy Ross Lanouette, 47, of Comox, British Columbia, both died in the accident. Of the 15 passengers killed in the accident, 13 were from Newfoundland and Labrador while one each was from Nova Scotia and British Columbia. The sole surviving passenger sustained serious injuries in the crash.

== Dramatization ==
The accident is featured in the Mayday episode "Atlantic Ditching".
