= Erg (tug) =

Erg was a vessel built and owned by Halifax Steamship Ltd. in 1915. She was used to ferry workers across the harbour to vessels under repair during the Second World War. Erg was sunk in the Halifax Harbour three times and is currently located in the Bedford Basin.

== Early service ==
Erg was originally a steam tug called Sambro and was built by the Halifax Shipyard in 1915. She was one of the earliest steel vessels to be built in Halifax. Sambro was 55 feet long and almost 15 feet wide, with a depth of 7 feet and her maximum tonnage was 28. The tug was originally sunk during the Halifax Explosion of 1917. In 1927, Sambro was raised out of the harbour and was converted from steam to diesel, being given a 4 horsepower engine. With this change, the tug was given a new name and a new purpose. The vessel was renamed Erg and was used as a transport tug, ferrying workers and their equipment from the shipyard to vessels under repair.

== Wartime harbour ==
Halifax Harbour was an extremely busy port during the Second World War. Because of this, navigational dangers increased with the congestion in the harbour. The Naval Service of Canada, which kept records of the activity in the harbour, advised that from 1940 to 1943, there were at least 12 vessels involved in accidents within Halifax Harbour. Vessels such as Camperdown, Claire Lilley and Nueva Indalucia ran aground, whereas others such as Otter, and Trongate caught fire and sank (or, in the case of Trongate, was made to sink as the flames were completely out of control). In 1940, Herbidean was sunk by the British ship Esmond; a forerunner to the fate of Erg.

== Wreck ==
On July 6, 1943, Erg was carrying workers and equipment (air compressors and electric generators) through the fog and rain, when she was run down by a Norwegian freighter – a steamship named Norelg (See Convoy SC 94 for more information on this ship). The tug immediately began sinking and as a result, 19 men lost their lives. On July 19, the Royal Canadian Navy utilized the floating crane Lord Kitchener to raise the wreck of Erg so the bodies of the deceased could be recovered. Only 10 bodies were discovered and removed from the wreck. Erg's sinking was and still is considered one of the worst accidents to have taken place in the Halifax Harbour and is the greatest loss of life in regards to a shipwreck within these waters.

Upon inspection, it was decided that Erg was beyond repair and on August 24, 1943, she was taken to her final resting place and sunk for the third and final time.

== Final resting place ==
The Erg shipwreck site was rediscovered in 2001 in the northern part of the Bedford Basin (near Roach Cove) by the Nova Scotia Exploration Society. The site is a protected heritage site and is visited by many divers. Objects which were recovered from Erg, such as the ships' whistle and portholes are currently on display at the Maritime Museum of the Atlantic on Lower Water Street.
