= Dartmouth Marine Slips =

Coordinates: 44.662958°N 63.563367°W

The Dartmouth Marine Slips was an historic shipyard and marine railway which operated in Dartmouth, Nova Scotia between 1859 and 2003. It was noted for important wartime work during the American Civil War as well as during the Battle of the Atlantic in World War II. After its closure, the site began redevelopment as King's Wharf, a high-rise residential development.

== Origins ==
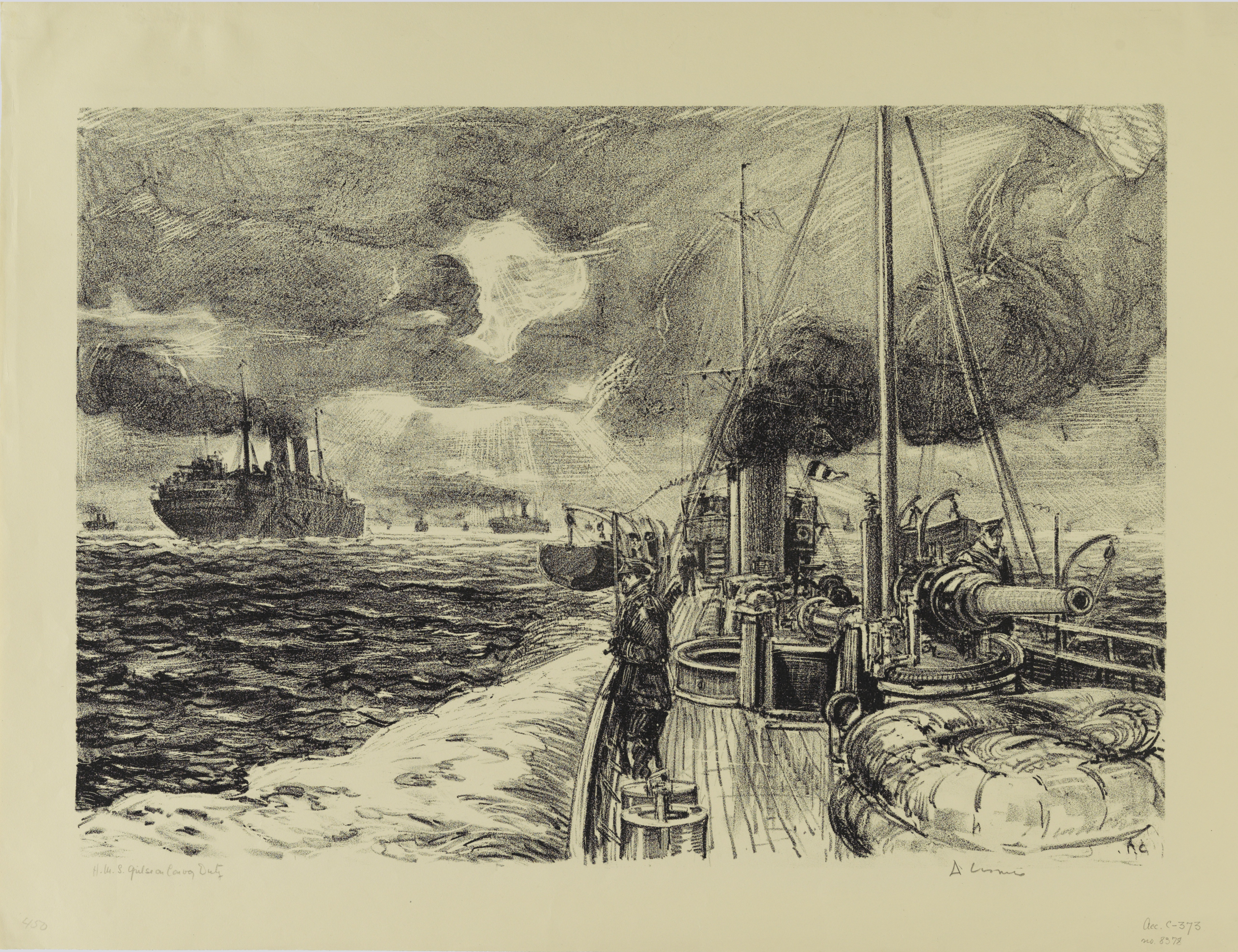
HMCS Grilse on Convoy Duty, a drawing by Arthur Lismer. The Slips were busy in World War II as they serviced such vessels as this which guarded convoys during the Battle of the Atlantic.

The Dartmouth Marine Slips were opened as the Chebucto Marine Railway in 1859 under the supervision of an American engineer, H.I. Crandall. His plans to use bilge and keel blocks to operate in conjunction with the current marine railway to haul ships in and out of the water was genius.

The construction and operation of the Chebucto Marine Railway would not have been possible without the following investors: U.S. Consul Albert Pillsbury; Robert Boak of Boak, Taylor and Co.; and John Wyide of Wier and Co.

The Chebucto Marine Railway was frequently used by merchant vessels and, at times, the Royal Navy. It enjoyed early success in the American Civil War by repairing the blockade runners of the American Civil War who paid premium fees for quick repairs. The Marine Railway specialized in refitting hulls that were badly damaged because of the heavy sea swells in the Northern Atlantic.

"Dart Slip", as it came to be known by many mariners, saw a large expansion and its heaviest work during the Battle of the Atlantic in World War II when the yard worked round the clock repairing merchant vessels and naval escort damaged by weather, enemy attacks, and collisions in convoys. The slip was ideally sized to quickly repair Flower-class corvettes, the workhorse ships of the Royal Canadian Navy.

== Employment ==
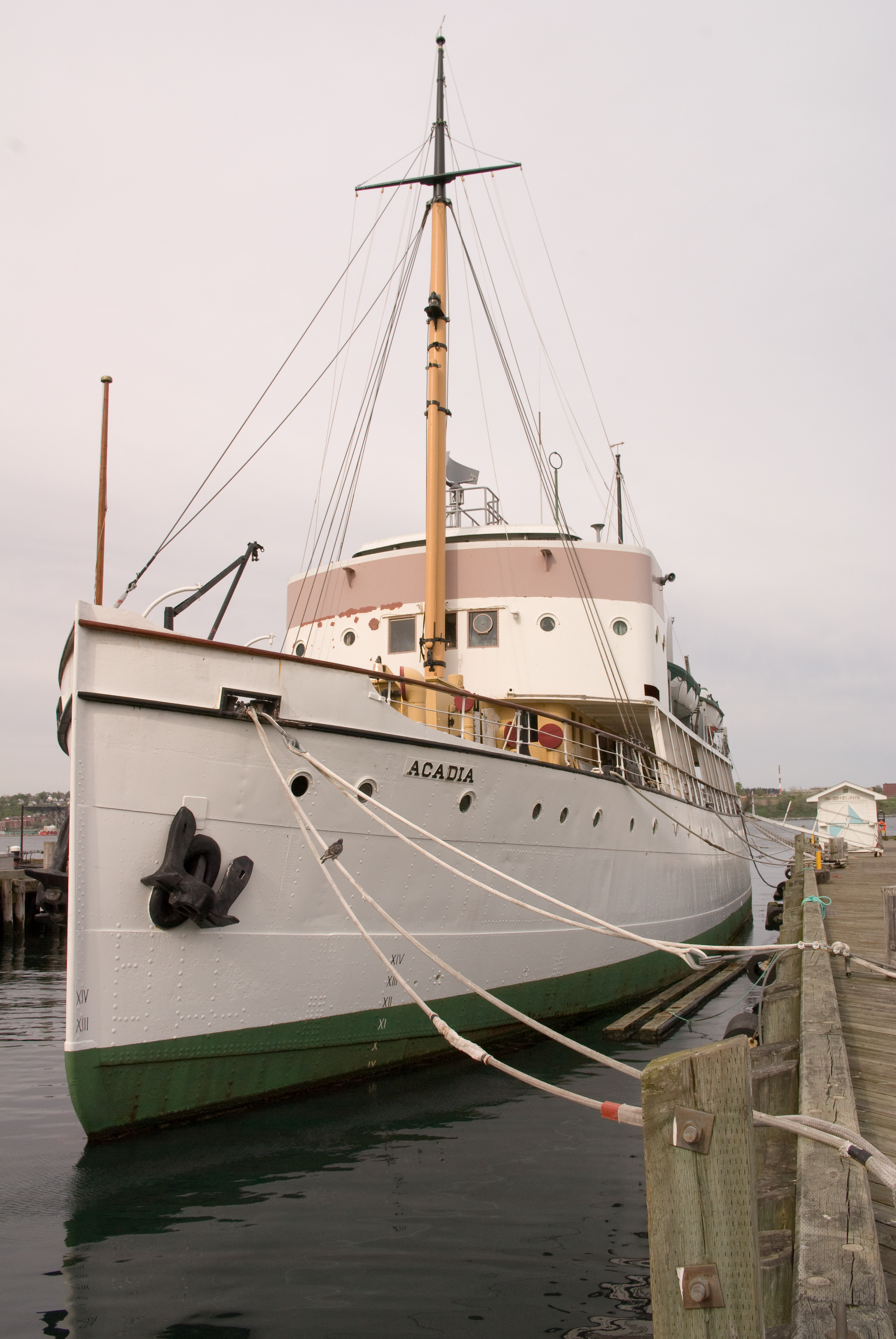
CSS Acadia was one of the many vessels serviced at the Dartmouth Marine Slips over its long history.

In 1898, the name changed from the Chebucto Marine Railway to the Dartmouth Marine Railway. At this time, hundreds of workers were employed by the shipyard with occupations ranging from shipwrights to painters. Regardless of occupation, the average work day for anyone working at the Dartmouth Marine Railway was at least 14 hours.

John Chappell and Alexander Lyle were notable shipbuilders during this time period, and now both are honored with streets being named after them in Dartmouth.

== Services ==
The final and most commonly known name, the Dartmouth Marine Slips, eventually evolved. They offered a complete range of repair services for vessels up to 3,000 tons. The Slips had a reputation for being a "quick turn-around" repair site. An additional 800 feet (240 m) of berthing space was created to accommodate vessels needing alongside repairs. The Dartmouth Marine Slips provided a variety of services in its latter years: emergency and scheduled repair services for international and domestic fleets, extended repair services to offshore supply vessels servicing drill rigs off Canada's east coast, and also offered float repairs anywhere in Atlantic Canada by mobile ship crew using work boats and work barges. Regular customers over the years included large fishing trawlers, Canadian Coast Guard vessels, the Halifax-Dartmouth ferries and historic vessels such as CSS Acadia.

== Closure ==
The Dartmouth Marine Slips were bought out in the 1990s by Irving Shipbuilding, owners of Halifax Shipyard which became known for a time as the Halifax Shipyards. Irving operated the two sites together, with the marine slips specializing in smaller and faster repair jobs. In 2003, despite the controversy it caused, the owners of the Dartmouth Marine Slips announced their plans to sell the Slips to Innovative Properties, a real estate development firm. Forty-four workers still employed at the shipyard were relocated to other Irving sites in the HRM region. The official closing date of the Dartmouth Marine Slips was June 20, 2003.

The plans for future development of the property, called Kings Wharf, were published in a flyer on July 31, 2007. The plans aimed at residential and commercial properties; however, due to complications, little progress was made at first with construction finally beginning in 2009. Upon completion, the tallest building on the site will be the tallest building in Atlantic Canada, and the tallest on the eastern seaboard of North America north of Boston.
