= Atlantic Osprey =

Ship built in 2003

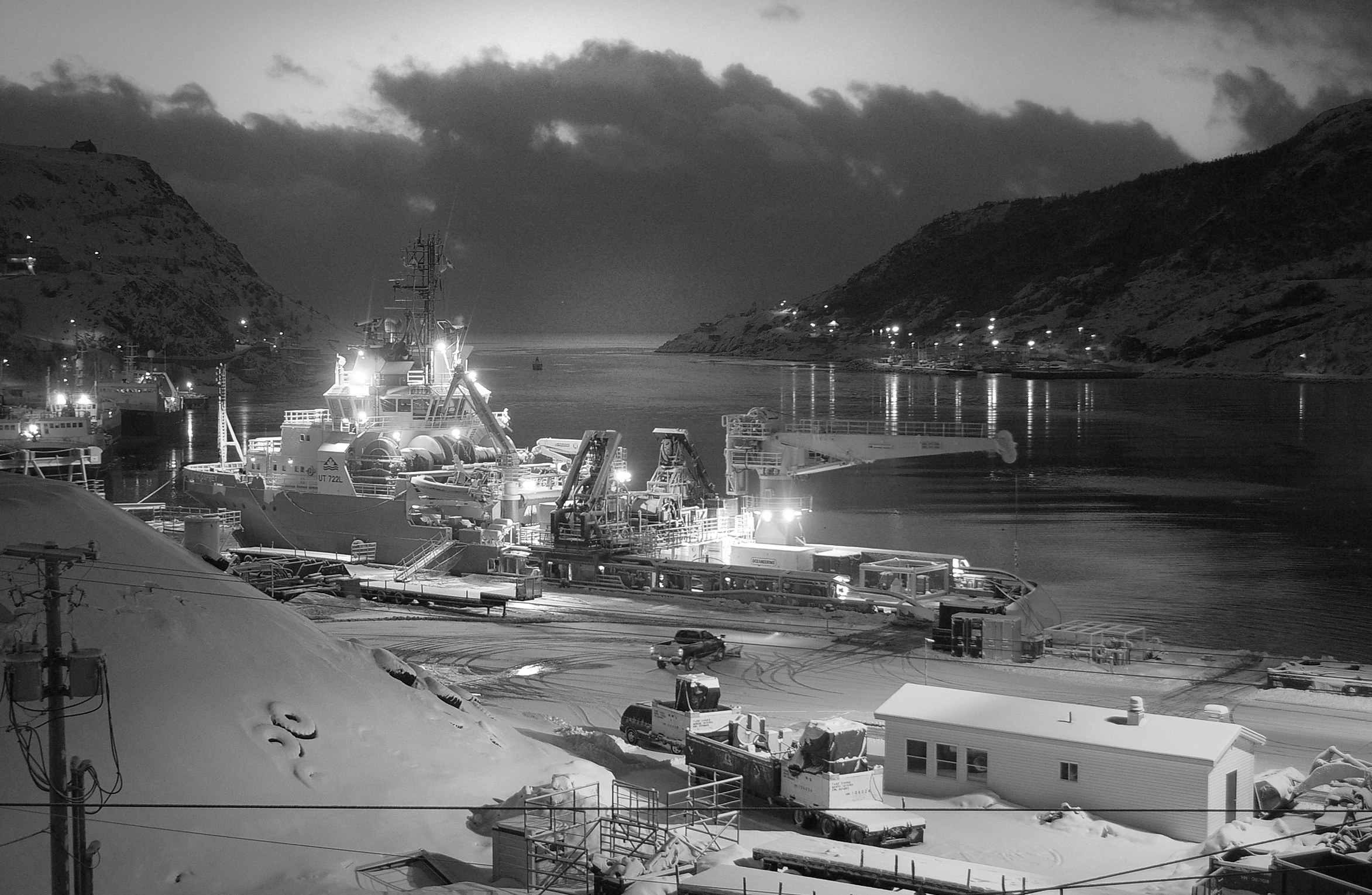
- Atlantic Osprey docked in St. John's, February 2007

History
- Name: Atlantic Osprey
- Operator: Atlantic Towing
- Port of registry: Halifax, Nova Scotia, Canada
- Builder: Halifax Shipyard
- Completed: 2003
- Identification: IMO number: 9255907

General characteristics
- Tonnage: 3,453 GT
- Length: 80 m (262 ft 6 in)
- Beam: 18 m (59 ft 1 in)
- Draught: 6.6 m (21 ft 8 in)
- Installed power: 4 × Bergen B32:40 diesel engines
- Propulsion: 2 × controllable pitch propellers
- Speed: 16 knots (30 km/h; 18 mph) (maximum)

Atlantic Osprey is an anchor handling tug supply (AHTS) vessel, launched 17 April 2003.

Built by Halifax Shipyard for operation by Atlantic Towing Limited, Atlantic Osprey is an Ulstein UT722L design intended for use in the offshore oil fields. With a 12 MW diesel engine, the 3,453 gross tonnage tug can transit at 16 knots (30 km/h).

In December 2005, she recovered the wreckage of a crashed Canadian Coast Guard helicopter near Marystown, Newfoundland.

She was the vessel used to recover wreckage and bodies following the 12 March 2009 crash of Cougar Helicopters Flight 91.
