= Chebucto Head =

Peninsula in Nova Scotia, Canada

Coordinates: 44°30′03″N 63°31′14″W

Chebucto Head in Nova Scotia

Chebucto Head is a Canadian headland on Nova Scotia's Chebucto Peninsula located within the community of Duncan's Cove.

Chebucto Head forms the most easterly point on the peninsula and is used to define the southwestern limit of Halifax Harbour; historically known to the Mi'kmaq Nation as "Jipugtug", (anglicised as "Chebucto") meaning "the biggest harbour", or simply, "the big harbour". A line drawn northeast from Chebucto Head to Pennant Point defines the southern geographic limit of the harbour. The actual legal limit of the harbour is located further inland to the north of this line.

== Lighthouse ==
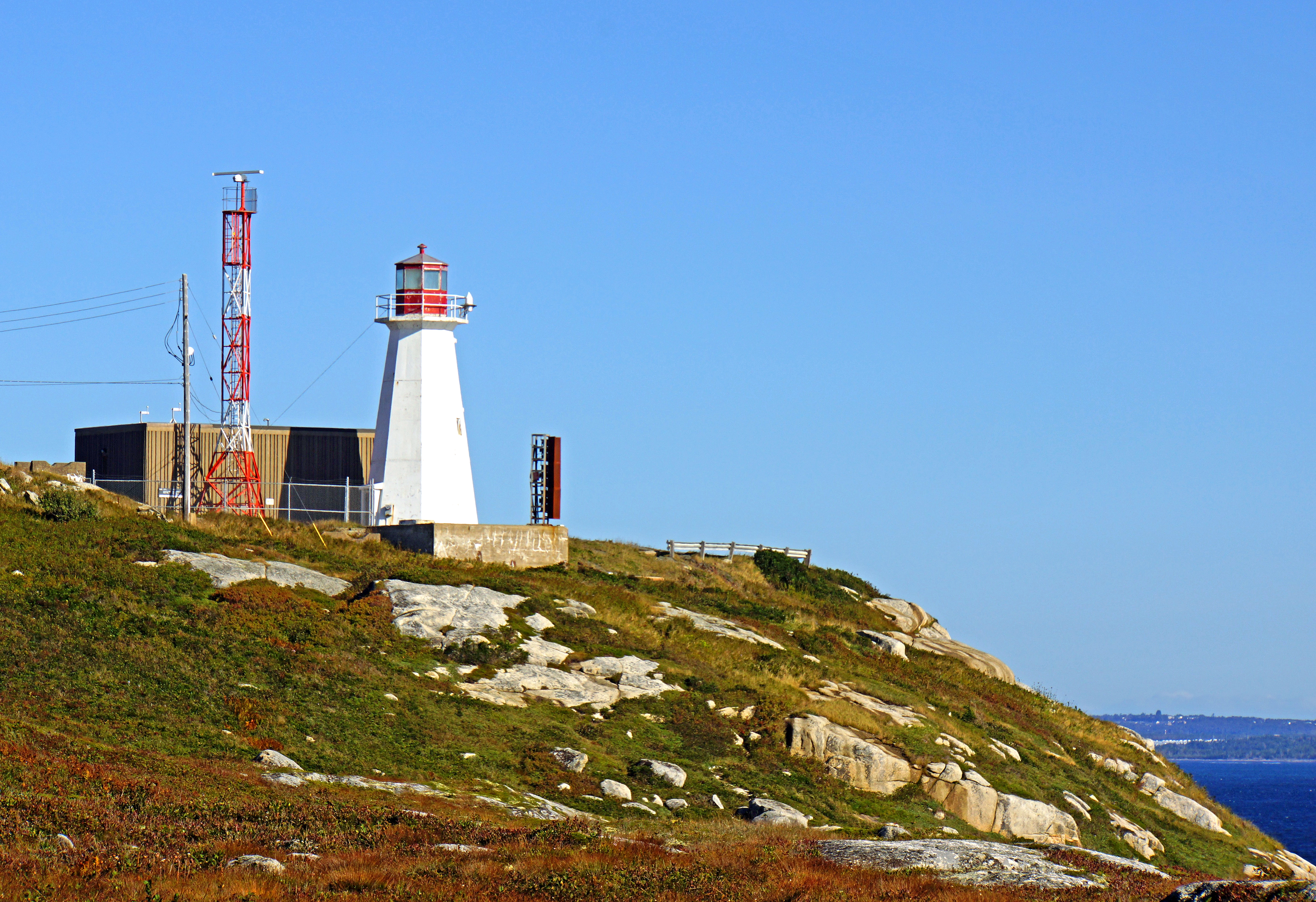
Chebucto Head lighthouse

The first lighthouse at Chebucto Head was built in 1872 with a steam foghorn just below it. It was replaced by a second tower in 1928. This tower was demolished in 1940 and a new lighthouse and combined keeper's dwelling was built several hundred metres to the north to make way for a gun battery. In 1967 the light was moved from the house to the a new concrete tower which still stands today. The house remained the keeper's dwelling until the light was destaffed in the 1990s. The house fell prey to repeated vandalism after the Canadian Coast Guard (CCG) cancelled the lease of the tenants who lived in and looked after the house. The plight of the lighthouse helped to inspire the Nova Scotia Lighthouse Preservation Society to push for the Heritage Lighthouse Protection Act, a campaign that was launched at the Chebucto Head lighthouse on March 11, 1999. The house was destroyed by a suspicious fire on March 25, 2004. The Chebucto Head Lighthouse Society, a group formed to try to save the lighthouse continues to work to keep the site preserved and open to the public.

Chebucto Head was used by the CCG as the control centre for the vessel traffic service or VTS that controlled vessel movements in Halifax Harbour until the 1980s when a new control centre was opened at Shannon Hill, above the Bedford Institute of Oceanography in Dartmouth. It continues as a Remote Aids to Navigation Station.

Chebucto Head inspired the name of the large harbour tug Point Chebucto, built at Halifax Shipyard in 1992.

== Gun battery ==
During World War II, Halifax Harbour was the primary fast convoy departure and arrival point in eastern North America. The Royal Canadian Artillery operated a searchlight and coastal gun battery at Chebucto Head as part of "Fortress Halifax" as a means of providing an integrated defence for the port. The Chebucto Head battery was the key outer battery of the western side of harbour defending it from possible attacks by German U-boats or surface raiders. The fortified battery was armed with three Elswick 6 in (150 mm) naval guns with associated searchlight, director tower, generators, a long-range optical rangefinder and by 1943 a radar artillery control unit. The battery was decommissioned in the early 1950s but many bunkers remain, now privately owned.

On 16 April 1945, HMCS Esquimalt, a minesweeper, was torpedoed and sunk off Chebucto Head by U-190, becoming the last Royal Canadian Navy warship lost to enemy action in World War II.
