= Andrew McArthur (shipbuilding) =

Andrew Arnott “Andy” McArthur (March 26, 1935 – February 26, 2024) was a Scottish-born Canadian shipbuilding executive.

== Early life ==
McArthur was born in Lochgelly, Fife, Scotland, and attended Kirkcaldy High School. McArthur entered the shipbuilding industry in 1952 as an apprentice draftsman at the Burntisland Shipyard in Burntisland, Fife, serving a five-year apprenticeship and earning a Higher National Certificate in Naval Architecture. McArthur then attended King's College, University of Durham (now the University of Newcastle upon Tyne), where he graduated with a B.Sc. in Naval Architecture in 1960. Shortly after graduating, McArthur moved to Denmark to accept a job as a naval architect at the Odense Steel Shipyard’s newly opened Lindø shipyard at Munkebo.

== Career in Canada ==
McArthur immigrated to Canada in December 1962 to begin work the following month in the production planning department at Saint John Shipbuilding and Dry Dock Co., Ltd., a shipyard in Saint John, New Brunswick, owned by Irving Shipbuilding Inc. He was soon promoted to a Technical Manager; his first major project with Saint John Shipbuilding was its 1964 contract with the Royal Canadian Navy to build two Protecteur-class auxiliary oiler replenishment ships.

McArthur became president and General Manager of Saint John Shipbuilding in 1975, serving until 1985. During this time, McArthur also chaired a federal consultative task force on the Canadian shipbuilding and repair industry in 1978.

The Saint John shipyard's largest project during McArthur's tenure as president was its successful 1983 bid to construct the RCN's Halifax-class frigates for $3.8 billion, which was the largest single shipbuilding contract ever awarded by the Navy at the time. The first batch of six frigates were built between 1987 and 1992; a second batch of six frigates was built by Saint John Shipbuilding between 1991 and 1996.

McArthur also oversaw Saint John Shipbuilding's construction of the second MV Abegweit between 1980 and 1982 for CN Marine. The ship took over passenger, vehicle and railway ferry services between Cape Tormentine, New Brunswick, and Borden-Carleton, Prince Edward Island, between 1982 and 1997, when the ferry service was replaced with the Confederation Bridge.

In 1985, McArthur and a group of investors formed a corporation, Halifax-Dartmouth Industries Limited (HDIL), to operate the Halifax Shipyard after its previous owner, Halifax Industries Limited, declared bankruptcy. McArthur served as president and CEO of HDIL from 1985 to 1994. In 1992, HDIL successfully bid for the construction for 12 Kingston-class coastal defence vessels for the Navy, at a cost of $650 million and completed between 1994 and 1998.

In 1994, the Halifax Shipyard was purchased by Irving Shipbuilding Inc., and McArthur stepped down as its president upon Irving's purchase of HDIL.

== Later life ==
After the sale of HDIL, McArthur founded a consultantcy firm, McArthur Consulting Ltd., which he ran until his retirement in 2018. During this time, McArthur also served as the chair of the Shipbuilding Association of Canada.

McArthur died in Halifax on February 26, 2024, at the age of 88.
