= SS Canadian Mariner =

1920 freighter ship

History

Canada
- Name: Canadian Mariner
- Owner: Canadian Government Merchant Marine Ltd, Canadian National Steamship Company
- Operator: Canadian Government Merchant Marine Ltd
- Port of registry: Montreal, Quebec
- Ordered: March 1918
- Builder: Halifax Shipyards Ltd, Nova Scotia
- Launched: September 4, 1920
- Completed: November, 1920
- Out of service: 1933
- Identification: Call sign TPWS
- Fate: Sold

Japan
- Name: Choyo Maru; Tyoyo Maru
- Owner: Dairen Kisen KK
- Acquired: 1933
- Out of service: December, 1942
- Fate: Torpedoed & sunk

General characteristics
- Type: General cargo
- Tonnage: 5,384 GRT; 3,311 NRT
- Length: 399.3 ft (121.7 m)
- Beam: 52.5 ft (16.0 m)
- Depth: 28.4 ft (8.7 m)
- Propulsion: Triple expansion steam engine

SS Canadian Mariner was a freighter built by Halifax Shipyards Ltd in 1920. She was the first steel ship built in Halifax and was used as a general cargo ship until she was sunk in the Pacific in 1942.

== Early life ==
The Canadian government commissioned the building of 63 ships in 1918 in an effort to start a crown funded shipping company, Canadian Government Merchant Marine Ltd. Canadian Mariner was built as the result of the two contracts awarded to Halifax Shipyards Ltd by the Canadian Government. The other contract was for her sister ship, SS Canadian Explorer.

== Transfer history ==
In 1928 management of Canadian Mariner was transferred from the failed Canadian Government Merchant Marine Ltd to Canadian National Steamship Company, which she steamed under until 1933 when she was eventually sold to Dairen Kisen KK of Japan to be used as a general cargo and supply vessel for the Japanese occupied Pacific Islands under the name Choyo Maru.

== Fate ==
On December 28, 1942, Choyo Maru was sunk by USS Kingfish off the northwest coast of Formosa, at position 24°46′N 120°40′E.

== Partial list of voyages ==
- December 8, 1920 : Halifax to Genoa
- June 16, 1921 : Montreal to Liverpool
- July 23, 1921 : Montreal to Australia
