= Terra Nova FPSO =

Floating production storage and offloading vessel

Coordinates: 46°28′30″N 48°28′46″W

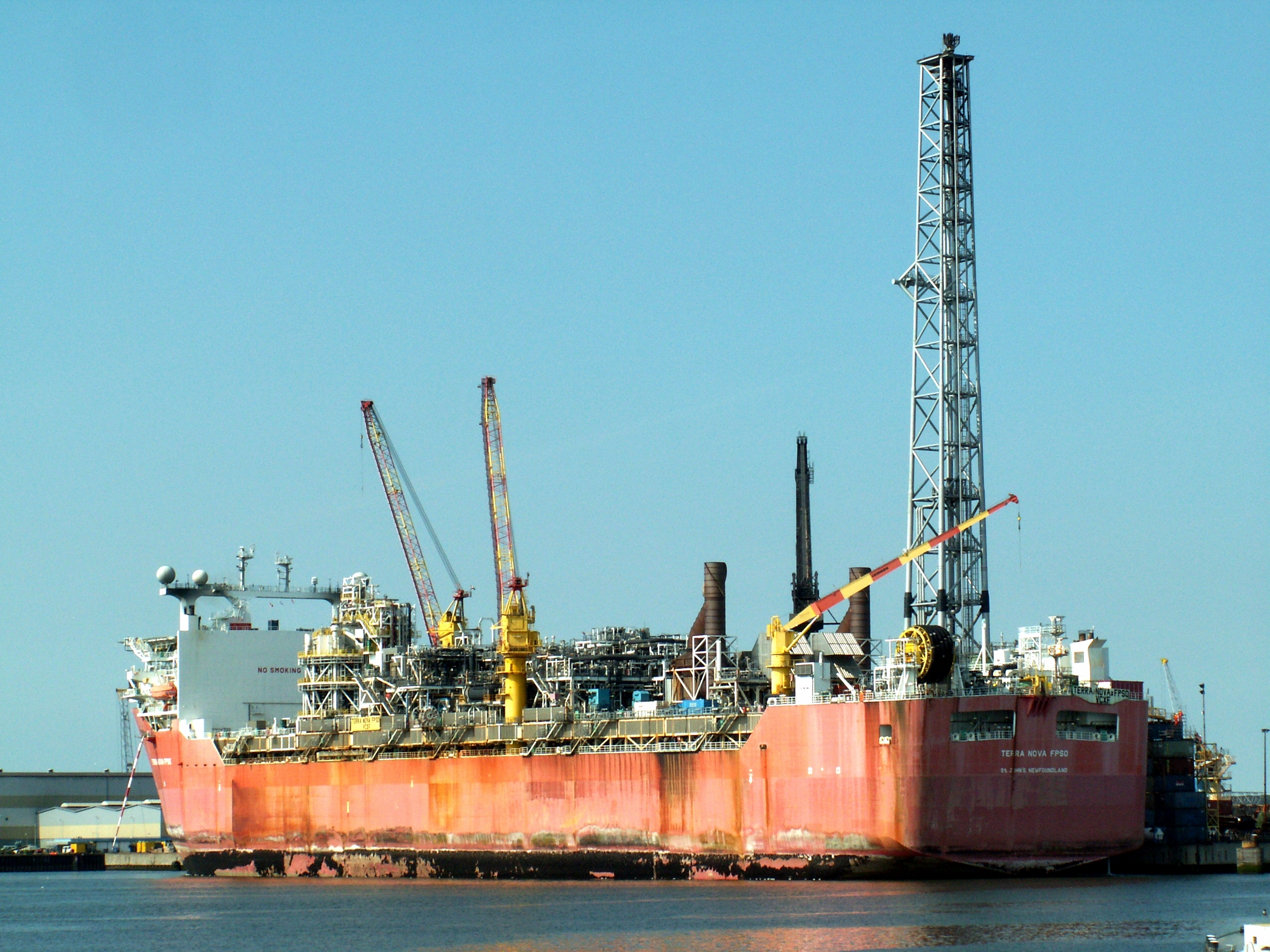

History

Petro-Canada
- Name: Terra Nova
- Builder: Daewoo Shipbuilding and Marine Engineering, Okpo, South Korea
- Launched: 1999
- In service: 2002
- Identification: IMO number: 9183532; MMSI number: 316298000; Callsign: VCXF
- Status: in active service

General characteristics
- Type: FPSO
- Displacement: 193 000 tonnes
- Length: 292.2 m
- Beam: 45.5 m
- Height: 91 ft 8 in (27.94 m)
- Propulsion: electric thrusters
- Capacity: Oil storage: 960,000 bbl (153,000 m^{3}); Oil production: 150,000 bbl (24,000 m^{3})/day; Gas production: 150×10^{6} cu ft/d (4.2×10^{6} m^{3}/d).
- Aviation facilities: Helipad

Terra Nova is a Floating Production Storage and Offloading Vessel (FPSO) for servicing the Terra Nova oil and gas field. Since 2019 the vessel has been off-field undergoing a life extension programme, initially at Bull Arm Fabrication Site, then Navantia, Ferrol. In February 2023, the vessel returned to Canada, as of 12th April is undergoing recommissioning at Bull Arm.

The Terra Nova field is operated by Suncor Energy Inc., with a 37.675% interest, located approximately 350 kilometres (220 mi) east off the coast of Newfoundland, Canada in the North Atlantic Ocean. The Terra Nova field is south of the successful Hibernia field and the more recent White Rose field. All three fields are in the Jeanne d'Arc Basin on the eastern edge of the famous Grand Banks fishing territory.

Terra Nova lost 165 m³ of oil into the ocean in 2004 because of two mechanical failures. In June 2006, production on Terra Nova was halted as the platform was sent to Rotterdam for a refit. She returned to the Terra Nova field on 25 September 2006.
