= Halifax Shipyard =

Shipbuilding company in Nova Scotia, Canada

- The modernized shipyard in 2026
- Type: Shipbuilding
- Founded: 1889
- Headquarters: Halifax, Nova Scotia
- Products: Ships
- Parent: Irving Shipbuilding
- Website: www.irvingshipbuilding.com/irving-shipbuilding-facilities-halifax-shipyard.aspx

Halifax Shipyard Limited is a Canadian shipbuilding company located in Halifax, Nova Scotia.

Founded in 1889, it is today a wholly owned subsidiary of Irving Shipbuilding Inc. and is that company's largest ship construction and repair facility.

== History ==
=== Halifax Graving Dock Company 1889–1918 ===
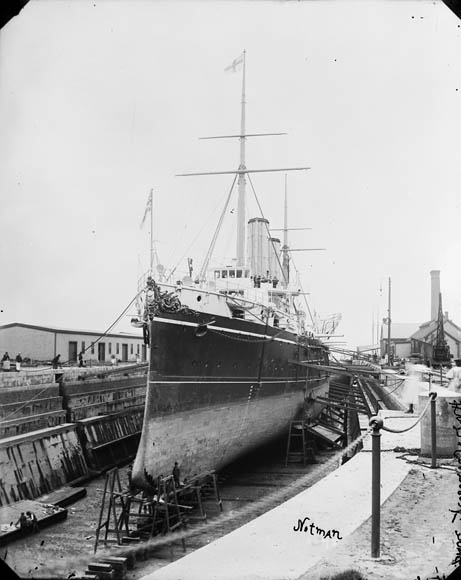
Halifax Graving Dock, 1900 with HMS Crescent

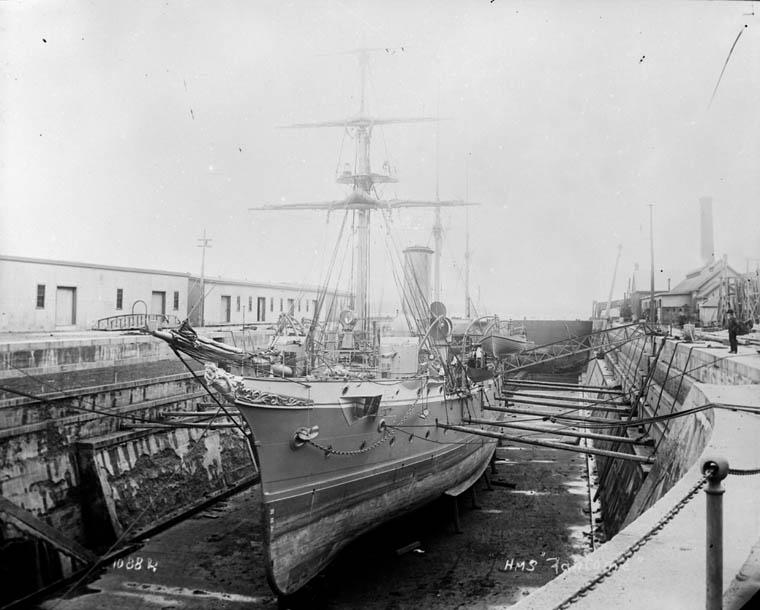
HMS Fantome in Halifax dry dock, 1903

The Halifax Graving Dock Company was formed by English investors who constructed the graving dock for $1 million, opening on September 21, 1889, on the western shore of Halifax Harbour in the community of Richmond. The following year on August 22, 1890, the Halifax Graving Dock Company purchased the Chebucto Marine Railway Company Limited located in Dartmouth Cove, at the mouth of the former Shubenacadie Canal in Dartmouth. The yard built a small steam tug for its own use in 1915, the tug Sambro.

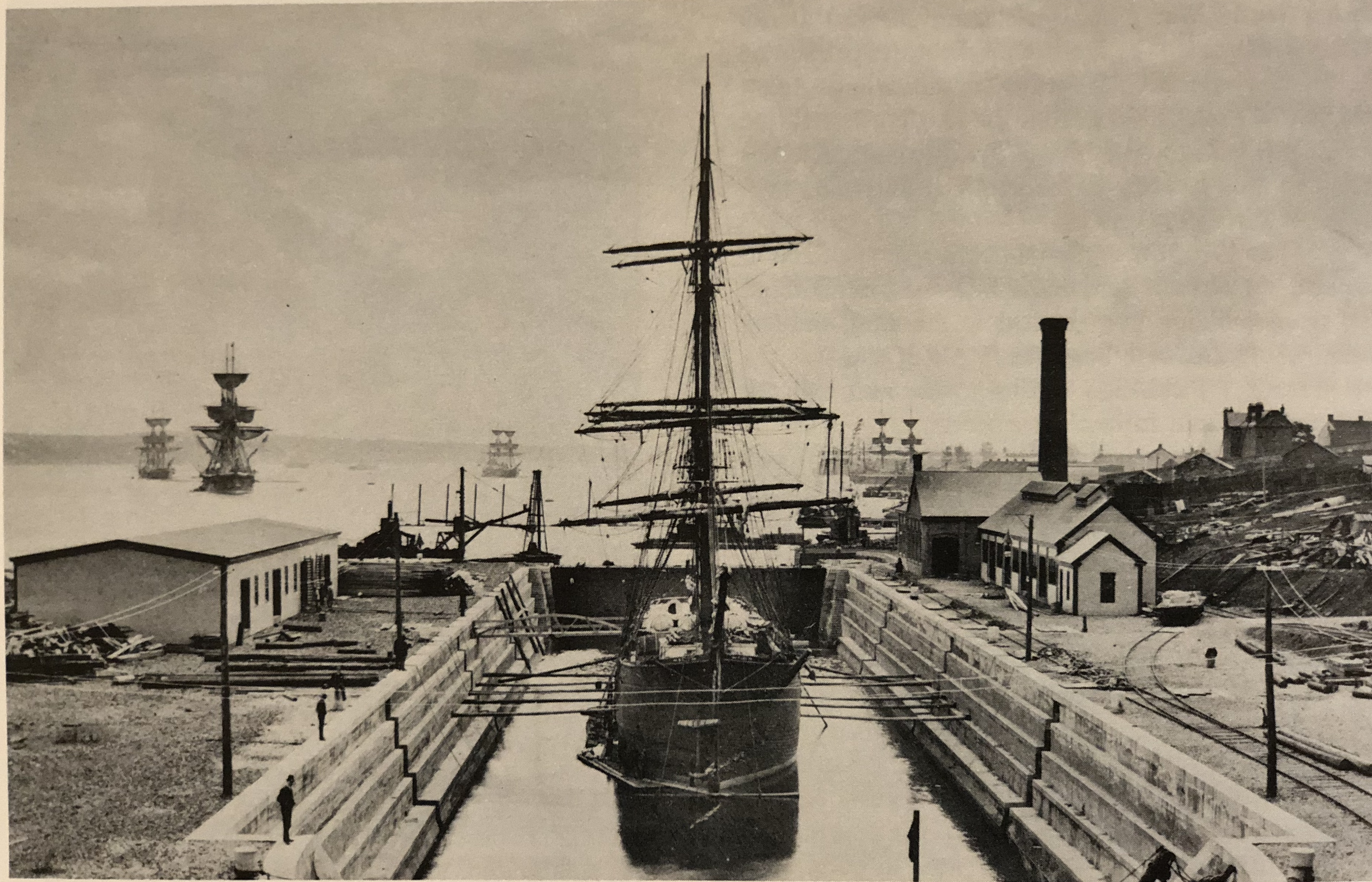
Barque Noel, Halifax Graving Yard, Halifax, Nova Scotia (1890), Barque made in the Osmond O'Brien Shipyard, Noel, Nova Scotia

During World War I, the Halifax Graving Dock Company's facilities on the Halifax side of the harbour were badly damaged by the December 6, 1917 Halifax Explosion, which occurred 300 m (980 ft) north of the graving dock. Many yard workers were killed and Sambro was sunk. The graving dock was quickly repaired and planning began to add building slips and plating shops for a modern ship yard to construct the first steel-hulled ships in Atlantic Canada. Sambro was raised and renamed Erg.

=== Halifax Shipyards Limited 1918–1978 ===
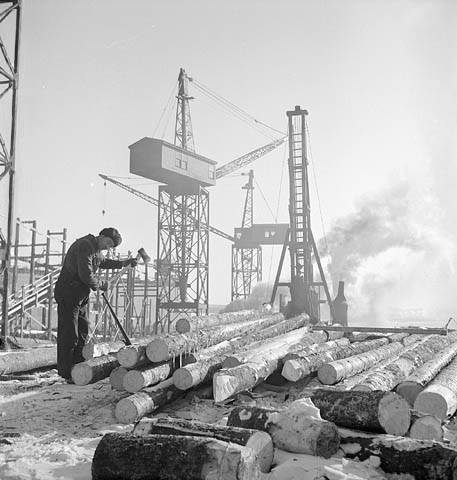
Halifax Shipyard cranes and gantries, 1942

In 1918 the Halifax Graving Dock Company's assets were purchased by Montreal investors who organized them into the Halifax Shipyards Limited, completing the shipyard and beginning ship construction in the final stages of World War I. In 1920 Halifax Shipyards Limited was acquired by the conglomerate British Empire Steel Corporation (BESCO). In 1930 Halifax Shipyards Limited was acquired by the conglomerate Dominion Steel and Coal Corporation (DOSCO). During World War II, the company's facilities were critical to the war effort as Halifax Shipyards Limited constructed four Tribal-class destroyers for the Royal Canadian Navy – the first all-Canadian built destroyers – and was vital in repairing more than 7,200 ships damaged in the Battle of the Atlantic.

From the early 1950s to the mid-1960s the shipyard won contracts with the Royal Canadian Navy to construct four destroyers as part of the RCN's post-war fleet modernization program. In 1957 Halifax Shipyards Limited was acquired by the conglomerate A.V. Roe Canada Ltd., which had purchased DOSCO and its subsidiary companies. In 1962 Halifax Shipyards Limited was acquired by the conglomerate Hawker Siddeley Canada which had purchased A.V. Roe Canada Ltd. and its subsidiary companies.

Under Hawker Siddeley ownership, the company began to diversify its contracts in the 1960s and 1970s, constructing ferries and other government contracts, as well as oil drilling rigs and drill ships for Atlantic Canada's nascent offshore oil and gas industry. Various repairs and smaller builds filled out the order sheet during this period.

=== Halifax Industries Limited 1978–1985 ===
In 1978 the parent company Hawker Siddeley was placed in receivership and the shipyard's assets were held by the primary creditor, the Government of Nova Scotia. A consortium named Halifax Industries Limited was organized and reached an agreement with the provincial government to operate the shipyard. A modernization program began in 1979 with a $7.5 million mill upgrading as well as a replacement program for yard infrastructure. The floating dry dock Prins Hendrik Dok No. 4 (RDM-173), built in Rotterdam in 1933 (by and for NV De Rotterdamsche Droogdok Maatschappij) was purchased and rebuilt by the shipyard in 1979. It was renamed Scotiadock and complemented the existing graving dock for ship repair and construction. In 1983 a new Panamax floating dry dock was purchased, having been built in 1982 by Marine Industries Limited in Sorel, Quebec. It was named Novadock and gave the shipyard the ability to repair the largest-sized ships on the eastern seaboard.

=== Halifax-Dartmouth Industries Limited 1985–1994 ===
In 1985 the shipyard declared bankruptcy and was purchased by a group of Nova Scotia investors, led by former Saint John Shipbuilding president Andy McArthur, who organized it as Halifax-Dartmouth Industries Limited (HDIL). In 1992, Quebec-based engineering firm SNC-Lavalin was the successful bidder for the Maritime Coastal Defence Vessel Project which would build what is today known as the Kingston class. SNC-Lavalin sub-contracted HDIL for the ship design and construction of the twelve vessels.

=== Halifax Shipyard Limited 1994 – Present ===
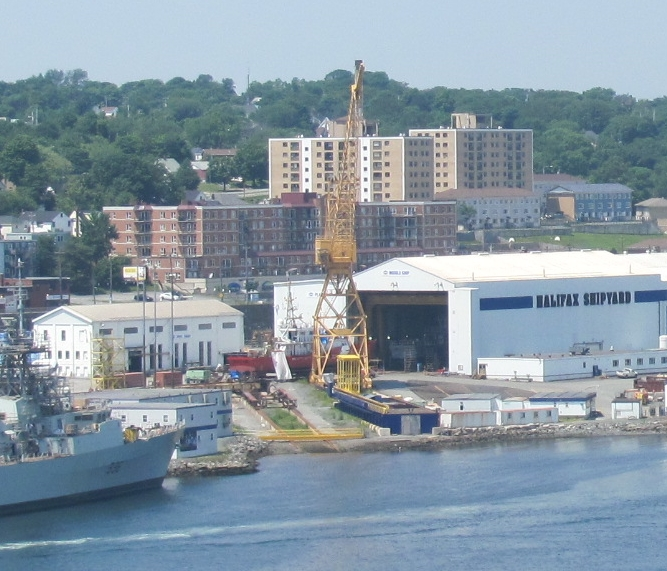
A Hero-class patrol vessel is readied for launch at Halifax Shipyard, 2013

In 1994, midway through the MCDV project, the shipyard's owners sold HDIL to Irving Shipbuilding Inc. of Saint John, New Brunswick who renamed the yard Halifax Shipyard Limited. In 1998, the shipyard purchased a replacement floating dry dock for the Scotiadock. The floating dry dock General Georges P Vanier was built by Canadian Vickers Ltd. in 1964. Upon purchase by Irving Shipbuilding, the dry dock was renamed Scotia Dock II. The original dry dock was later scrapped.

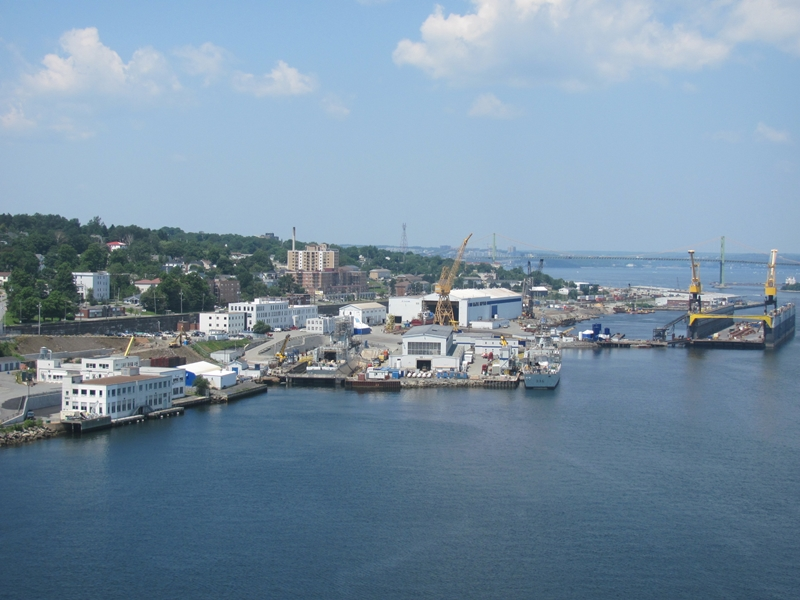
Halifax Shipyard viewed from the Macdonald Bridge in 2013, before expansion

Like all Canadian shipyards, Halifax Shipyard Limited underwent a dramatic slowdown in new construction and refit business during the late 1990s and throughout the 2000s due to changes in Government of Canada tax and tariff policies for ship owners, as well as a reduction in federal government construction for warships, icebreakers, ferries and scientific vessels. On June 27, 2003, Irving Shipbuilding announced it had an agreement with the federal government to permanently close the country's largest shipyard, Saint John Shipbuilding in Saint John. The competing Davie Yards Incorporated in Lauzon, Quebec experienced similar financial difficulty and spent much of the decade in mothball status. This left Halifax Shipyard Limited as the largest full-service shipyard left on Canada's Atlantic coast and the flagship facility for Irving Shipbuilding Inc.

A handful of new-build contracts for oil rig supply vessels, a cruise ship, as well as repair and maintenance contracts for Royal Canadian Navy warships and Canadian Coast Guard icebreakers and scientific vessels, public and privately owned ferries, commercial ships, and oil rigs has kept Halifax Shipyard Limited moderately busy in recent years.

In September 2009 Irving Shipbuilding was awarded a contract to build the Hero-class patrol vessel project for the Canadian Coast Guard. The nine vessels were scheduled to be delivered by 2014–2015.

In October 2011 Irving Shipbuilding was deemed the successful proponent for constructing 23 warships for the Royal Canadian Navy under the $35 billion National Shipbuilding Procurement Strategy. This merit-based competition will see the federal government enter into an exclusive contract with Irving Shipbuilding to supply the vessels over the next 20 years.

Scotia Dock II sunk in May 2010 while preparing to allow a tugboat to enter. Although it was subsequently raised, it was determined to be damaged beyond repair, so it was sold for scrap in 2012. The shipyard planned a replacement as part of its preparations for implementing the National Shipbuilding Procurement Strategy.

In 2013 Irving Shipbuilding started its $300-million modernization of the Halifax Shipyard to accommodate the building of vessels for the federal government.

== Partial list of ships built ==
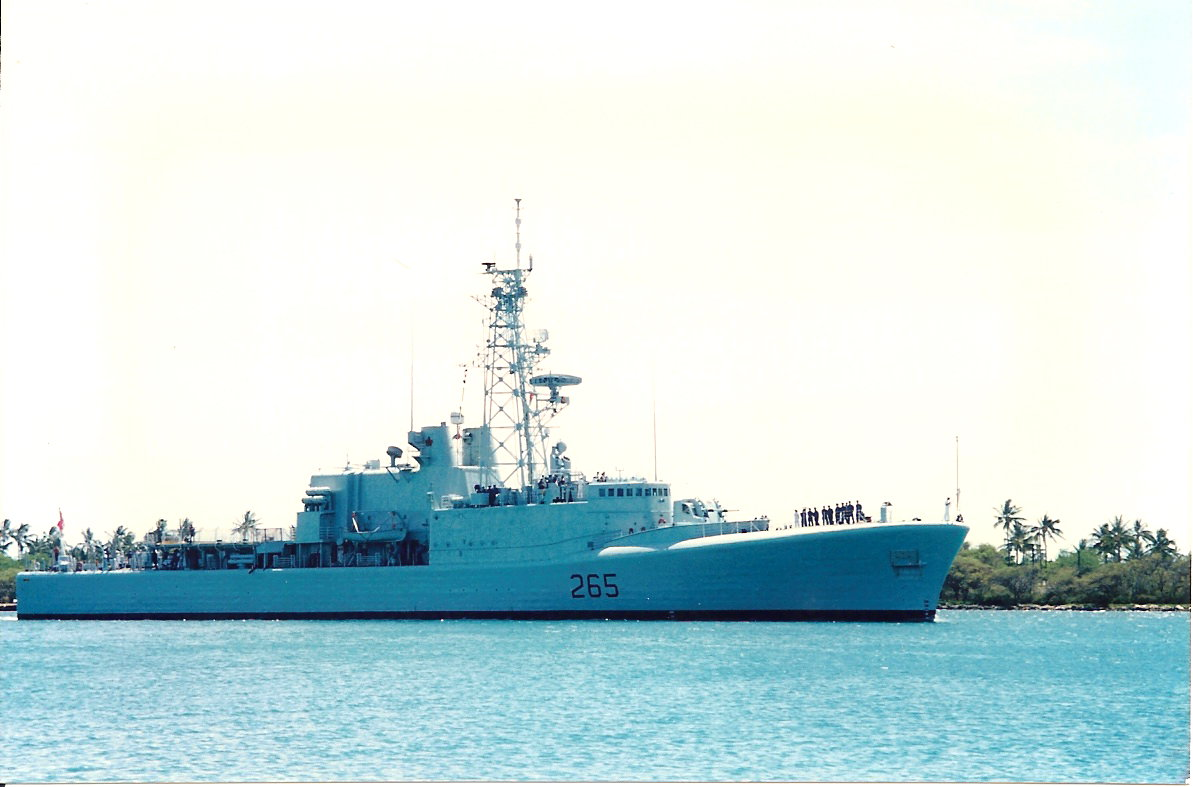
HMCS Annapolis off Pearl Harbor, 1995

- St. Laurent-class destroyer
  - HMCS Saguenay (DDH 206) launched 1953
  - HMCS Margaree (DDH 230) launched 1956
- Restigouche-class destroyer
  - HMCS Chaudière (DDE 235) launched 1957
- Annapolis-class destroyer
  - HMCS Annapolis (DDH 265) launched 1963

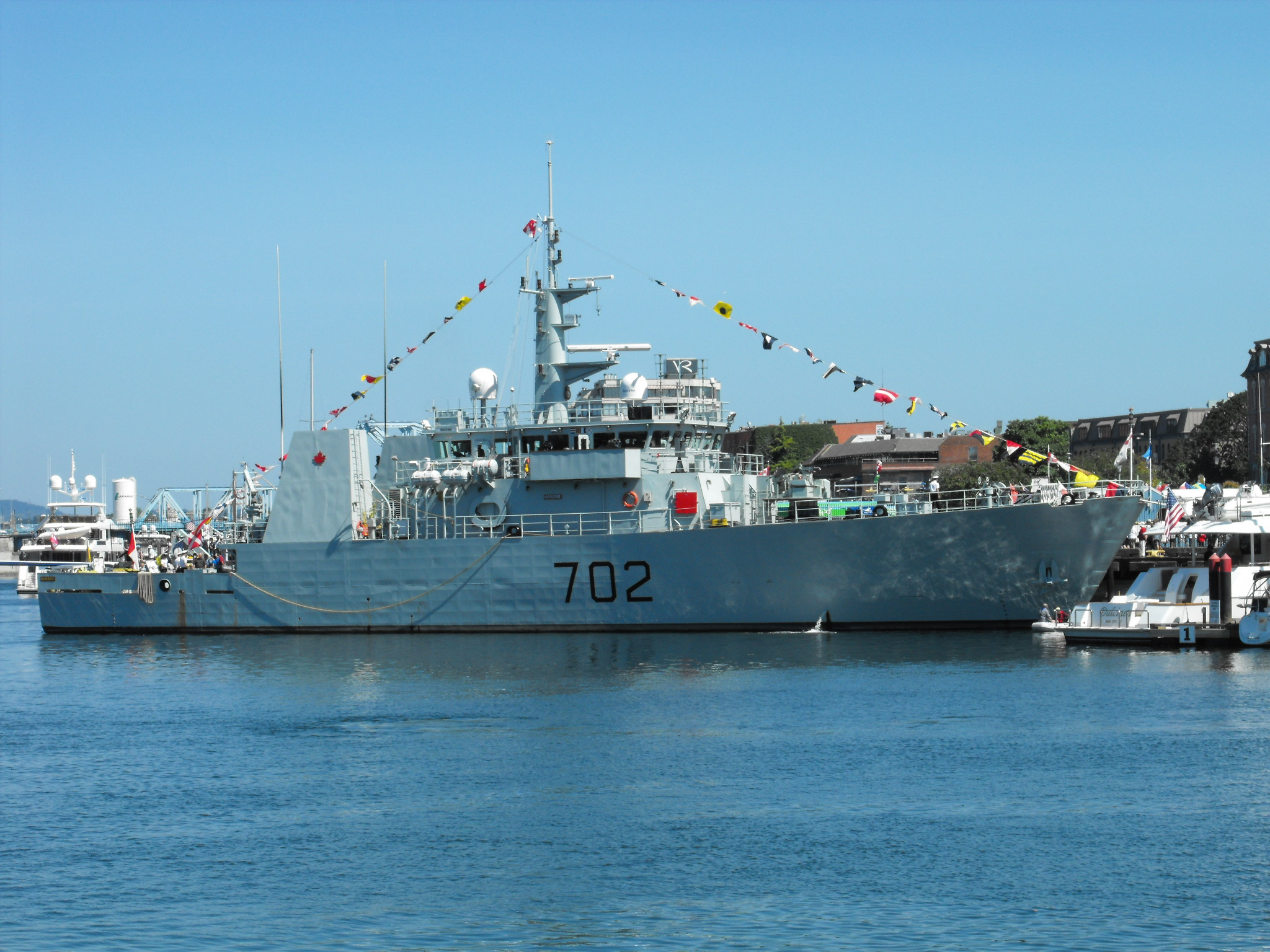
HMCS Nanaimo in Victoria, British Columbia for Canada Day celebrations, July 2009.

- Tribal-class destroyer
  - HMCS Micmac (R10) launched 1943
  - HMCS Nootka (R96) launched 1944
  - HMCS Cayuga (R04) launched 1945
  - HMCS Athabaskan (R79) launched 1945

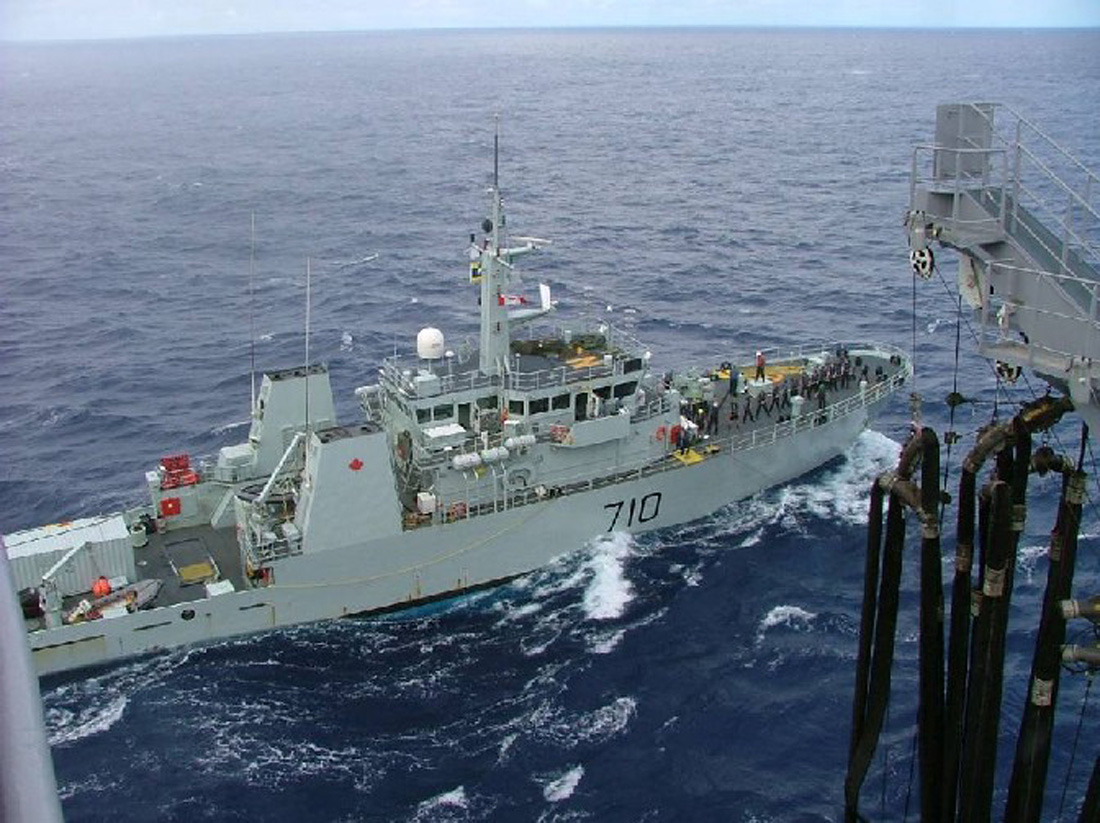
HMCS Brandon at sea in 2004

- Kingston-class coastal defence vessel:
  - HMCS Kingston (MM 700), launched in 1996
  - HMCS Glace Bay (MM 701), launched in 1996
  - HMCS Nanaimo (MM 702), launched in 1997
  - HMCS Edmonton (MM 703), launched in 1997
  - HMCS Shawinigan (MM 704), launched in 1997
  - HMCS Whitehorse (MM 705), launched in 1998
  - HMCS Yellowknife (MM 706), launched in 1998
  - HMCS Goose Bay (MM 707), launched in 1998
  - HMCS Moncton (MM 708), launched in 1998
  - HMCS Saskatoon (MM 709), launched in 1998
  - HMCS Brandon (MM 710), launched in 1999
  - HMCS Summerside (MM 711), launched in 1999
- Icebreakers
  - CCGS N.B. McLean, launched in 1930
- Ferries:
  - MV Confederation, Canadian National Railway and later by Northumberland Ferries Limited, launched in 1962 (scrapped 2007)
  - Manco Capac, PeruRail rail car ferry at Lake Titicaca, built and knocked down in 1970, re-assembled at Lake Titicaca in 1971
  - Petit Princess, Nova Scotia Dept. of Transport, launched in 2004

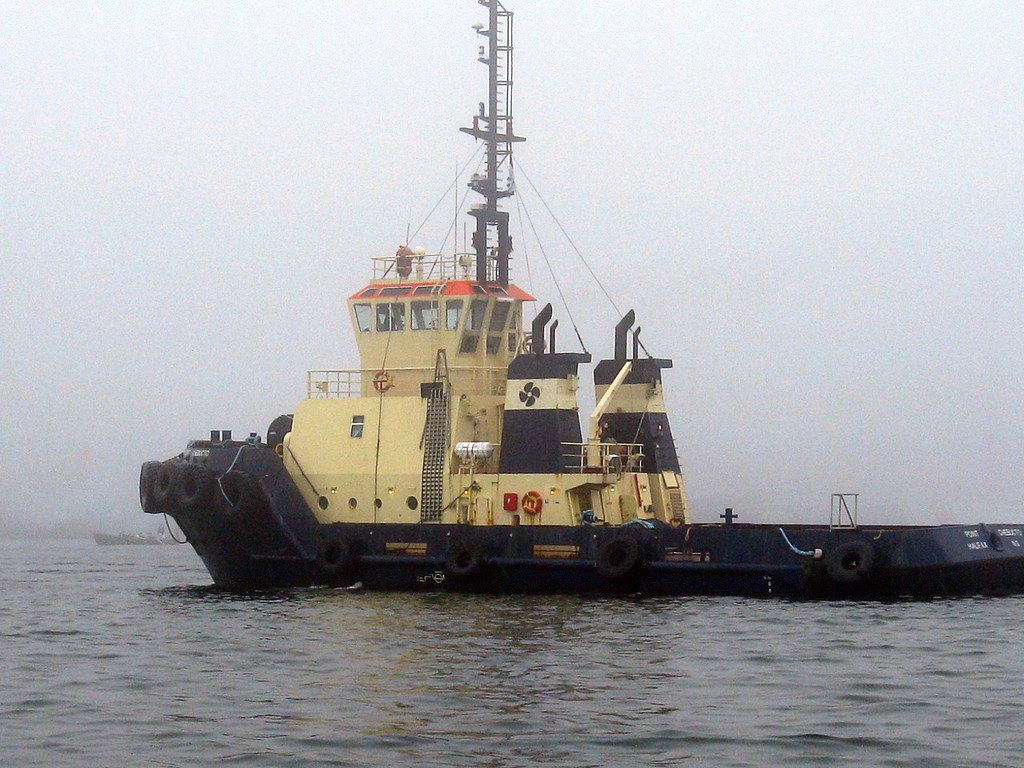
Point Chebucto at work in Halifax Harbour, 2009

- Cargo steamships
  - SS Canadian Mariner, launched in 1920
  - SS Canadian Explorer, launched in 1921
  - SS Canadian Cruiser, refrigerated ship, launched in 1921
  - SS Canadian Constructor, refrigerated ship, launched in 1922
- Cargo/Passenger Steamships
  - Bahia Aguirre, launched in 1950
  - Bahia Buen Suceso, launched in 1950
  - Bahia Thetis, launched in 1950
- Cruise ships:
  - Pearl Mist, launched in 2009

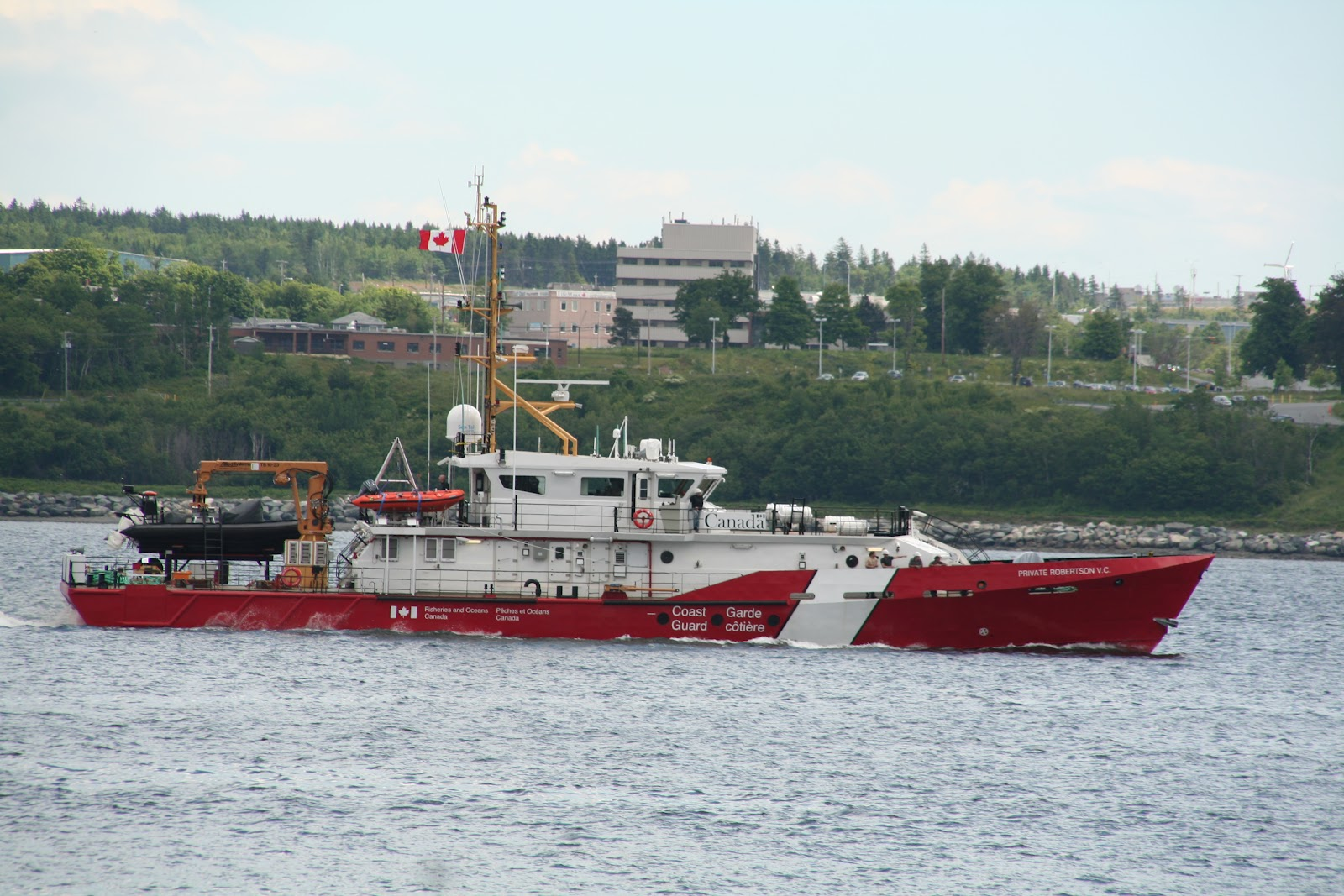
CCGS Private Robertson V.C.

- Harbour tugs
  - Sambro/Erg launched in 1915
  - Point Chebucto launched in 1992
- Anchor handling tug supply vessels:
  - Atlantic Eagle, launched in 1999
  - Atlantic Hawk, launched in 2000
  - Atlantic Kingfisher, launched in 2002
  - Atlantic Osprey, launched in 2003
  - Atlantic Condor, launched in 2010
- Hero-class patrol vessels
  - CCGS Private Robertson V.C., launched in 2012
  - CCGS Caporal Kaeble V.C., launched in 2012
  - CCGS Corporal Teather C.V., launched in 2012
  - CCGS Constable Carrière, launched in 2013
  - CCGS G. Peddle S.C., launched in 2013
  - CCGS Corporal McLaren M.M.V., launched in 2013
  - CCGS A. LeBlanc, launched in 2014
  - CCGS M. Charles M.B., launched in 2014
  - CCGS Captain Goddard M.S.M., launched in 2014
- Harry DeWolf-class offshore patrol vessels
  - HMCS Harry DeWolf, launched in 2018
  - HMCS Margaret Brooke, launched in 2019
  - HMCS Max Bernays, launched in 2021
  - HMCS William Hall, launched in 2022
  - HMCS Frédérick Rolette, launched in 2023
  - HMCS Robert Hampton Gray, launched in 2024
  - CCGS Donjek, launched in 2026
  - CCGS Sermilik, laid down 2025

== Ships to be built ==
- River-Class destroyer, 15 planned vessels (see National Shipbuilding Procurement Strategy)
  - HMCS Fraser, laid down 2025
  - HMCS Saint-Laurent, ordered 2025
  - HMCS Mackenzie, ordered 2025

== Maintenance Contracts with RCN ==
In 2018, Halifax Shipyard was selected as one of three shipyards to shared contracts for maintenance and repair of the Halifax-class frigates. Along with Davie Shipbuilding in Quebec and Seaspan ULC's Victoria Shipyards in British Columbia, Halifax Shipyard will be responsible for a minimum of three frigates.
