= Point Chebucto =

Harbour tug built at the Halifax Shipyard in Halifax, Nova Scotia, Canada

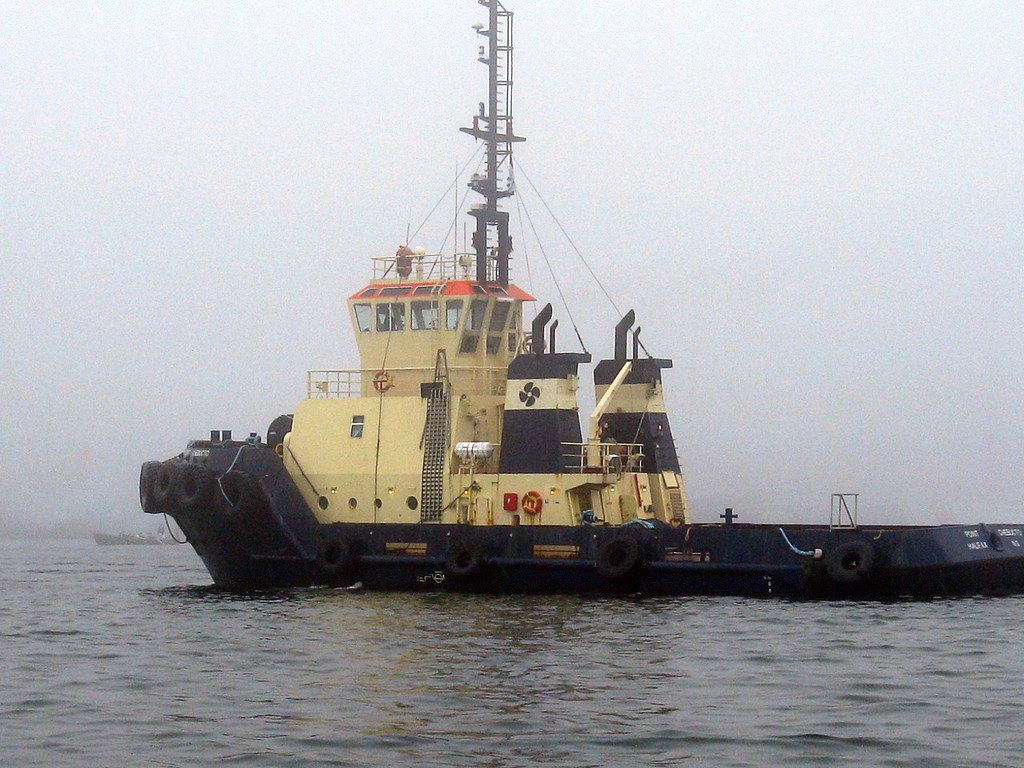
Point Chebucto at work in Halifax Harbour, 2009

Point Chebucto is a harbour tug that was built at the Halifax Shipyard in Halifax, Nova Scotia, Canada in 1992. She was christened in January of 1993 by Mrs. Joyce Watson, wife of Cpt. David A. Watson. She is one of very few harbour tugs that were built at the Halifax Shipyards. She has been aiding ships in and out of Halifax Harbour and later Port Hawkesbury, Nova Scotia since she was registered in January 1993. The tug was built for Eastern Canada Towing Limited, a company that has been around for over 60 years. The tug is named after the point at Chebucto Head, continuing the tradition of Eastern Canada Towing of naming its tugs after points. Eastern Canada Towing took over Foundation Maritime's work in the field of Harbour, Coastal and Deep-Sea tow and salvage. The firm owns and operate a fleet of modern tugs ranging from 1250 HP - 5400 HP. Most tugs are ice strengthened, with several having Ice Class 1 certification. Their head office is also in Halifax. Eastern Canada Towing was purchased in 2007 by Svitzer, a tug boat division of Maersk.

Point Chebucto is powered by twin diesel engines which put out 4000 HP and is an azimuthing stern drive tug. Her tonnage is 434 gt and she is 33.31 meters long. Her breadth is 10 meters, she sits 4.24 meters in the water and has a max speed of 12 knots. She has a very high bow made for berthing high sided ships; however, she is too high for some ships that arrive in the Halifax Harbour. Smaller tugs would be used for such ships. She is equipped with the very latest in navigational equipment and is known as a very good sea boat in rough weather, although she has not operated much further from Halifax than Lunenburg, Nova Scotia. Her companion tug is the Point Halifax, which was built in England in 1986 and usually makes the long trips. However, she is not as sea friendly and the crews have noted that she is a "roller" compared to Point Chebucto. While Point Halifax was under protracted repairs to one of her stern drives from an incident in the Strait of Belle Isle last August, Point Chebucto took over her duties.

In July 2010, Point Chebucto, along with her sister tugs were reassigned from Halifax to Port Hawkesbury to handle ships in Cape Breton as part of an agreement between Irving owned Atlantic Towing and Svitzer owned Eastern Canada Towing which left tug duties in Halifax to Atlantic Towing and tug work in Cape Breton to Svitzer. Point Chebucto left Halifax for Port Hawkesbury on July 29, ending nearly 100 years of tug work in Halifax by her company.
