= Penny & Giles =

British engineering company

Penny & Giles (P&G) was a British engineering company in Dorset (former Hampshire) that made flight recorders (black boxes).

== History ==
The company was founded in 1956 by Prof William Alfred Penny and James Giles. It made high-reliability wire-wound potentiometers for aircraft in flight testing.

In 1957, it made the first aircraft data recorder with magnetic recording on a stainless steel wire, known as a black box. In 1963, the Ministry of Aviation informed the UK aircraft industry that all civil airliners would have to have flight data recorders.

In April 1973, Penny and Giles Conductive Plastics received a Queen's Award for Enterprise: Innovation (Technology). It became known as Penny and Giles International, with four divisions. In April 1992 it won another Queen's Award for Enterprise.

In the 1990s, it was known as Penny & Giles Data Recorders Limited, and claimed to be the world's leading manufacturer of aircraft data recorders.

=== Ownership ===
In 1992, it was bought by Bowthorpe Holdings for £30m.

The company was bought out in 2002 by Curtiss-Wright of the USA, and is now part of Curtiss-Wright Controls Integrated Sensing.

== Structure ==
It was headquartered at Mudeford in Dorset.

== Products ==
- LVDT and RVDT transducers
- Optical Quick Access Recorders (O-QAR) for civil airliners

== See also ==
- Teledyne Controls
