= Chebucto (ferry) =

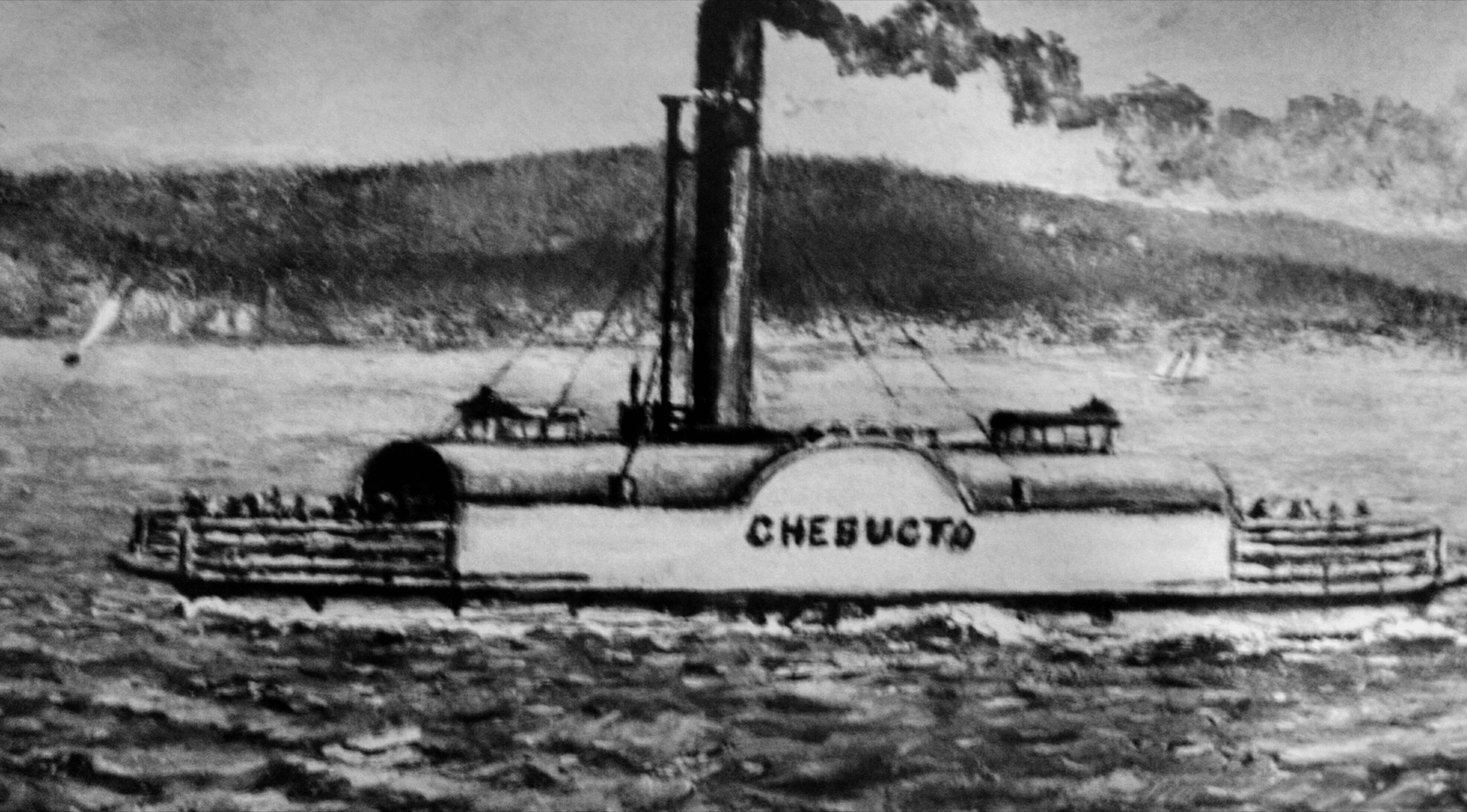
- "Chebucto in the 1870s" Painting by George Craig. Dartmouth Heritage Museum

History
- Name: Chebucto or Chebucto I
- Owner: Nova Scotia
- Route: Halifax – Dartmouth.
- Builder: "Cameron" of New Glasgow. Built in Dartmouth.
- Completed: 1865
- Identification: IMO number: 75843
- Fate: Sold for $275 in 1892

General characteristics
- Type: Ferry
- Tonnage: 65.3 (N.R.T)
- Length: 86 ft (26 m)
- Depth: 9 ft (2.7 m)
- Propulsion: Side paddlewheels, engine (ex-Boxer I)

The Chebucto (ferry), also referred to as the Chebucto I, was a passenger ferry used in Halifax–Dartmouth Ferry Service in Halifax Harbour, connecting Halifax and Dartmouth from 1865 until 1892.

== Construction ==
The ferry was constructed in 1865 using the engine from an earlier ferry, the Boxer I, built by Alexander Lyle. Lyle, who had also built the two ferries preceding the Boxer, died in 1858. A man from New Glasgow named Mr. Cameron was hired in Lyle's place to build the new ferry in Dartmouth Nova Scotia. It was the last ferry to be built locally in Dartmouth until the Governor Cornwallis ferry in 1940.

== Incidents ==
The Chebucto suffered a few minor damages over the years due to accidents, but nothing major enough to end its use. These accidents were mainly the Chebucto colliding with other boats or docks causing zero to mild damages. It has however, been used on multiple occasions to tow other damaged ferries to shore.

One of the most notable incidents on the Chebucto, happened on June 29, 1875, when a man and his daughter were aboard the ferry on their horse and wagon heading to Halifax. Something caused the horses to panic which resulted in the daughter, horse, and wagon to fall overboard. The horse drowned despite trying to swim for a short time. The horse was pulled under the surface by the sinking wagon, as it was still attached to it. The daughter was rescued and survived.

This unusual and tragic event led to the implication of stronger guard cables on ferries to prevent any more unfortunate accidents of similar nature.

== Legacy ==
During the time the Chebucto was in use, it was mostly running alongside the Sir Charles Ogle, and the Micmac, which were two other ferries in the Halifax Harbour.

Despite a delayed completion, disappointing first launch, and other incidents, the Chebucto served as one of the links between the cities of Halifax and Dartmouth for 27 years. It was finally sold in 1892 for only $275.

In 1906, 14 years after the sale of the Chebucto, a new ferry with the same name was built to use in the harbour between Halifax and Dartmouth. These ferries are also known as Chebucto I and Chebucto II, respectively.
