= SeaRose FPSO =

Floating production storage and offloading launched in 2004

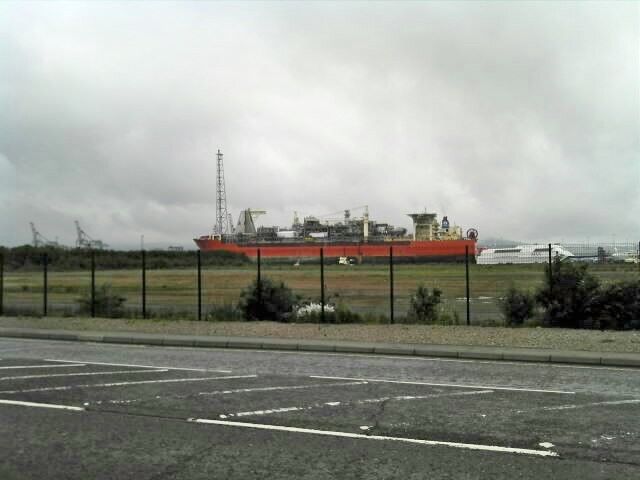
- SeaRose FPSO coming into Belfast, Northern Ireland, United Kingdom on June 6th 2012

History
- Name: SeaRose FPSO
- Owner: Cenovus Energy, Suncor Energy, Nalcor
- Operator: Cenovus Energy
- Port of registry: Canada; St. John's, Newfoundland and Labrador
- Ordered: March 2002
- Builder: Samsung Heavy Industries; Geoje, South Korea
- Launched: April 2004
- Identification: Call sign: VOXS; DNV ID: 24492; IMO number: 9274501; MMSI no.: 316317000
- Status: Operational

General characteristics
- Type: FPSO
- Tonnage: 93,984 GT; 40,132 NT; 150,000 DWT
- Displacement: 187,100 long tons (190,102 t)
- Length: 258 m (846 ft)
- Beam: 46 m (151 ft)
- Draught: 18.043 m (59.20 ft)
- Propulsion: Wärtsilä 8L46B generators (7,800 kW); Wärtsilä SCV95 gearboxes; Lips 5.5 m-diameter controllable pitch propellers
- Speed: 12 knots (22 km/h; 14 mph)
- Capacity: Oil storage: 940,000 bbl (149,000 m^{3}); Oil production: 140,000 bbl (22,000 m^{3})/day; Gas production: 180 million cu ft/d (5.1 million m^{3}/d) at 1 bar.

SeaRose FPSO is a floating production, storage and offloading vessel primarily located in the White Rose oil and gas field, approximately 350 kilometres (190 nmi; 220 mi) east-southeast off the coast of Newfoundland, Canada in the North Atlantic Ocean. The White Rose field is currently operated by Cenovus Energy (as of 2021, after its acquisition of Husky Energy), with a 60% ownership interest. Suncor Energy owns a 35% interest, and Nalcor the remaining 5%.

SeaRose is approximately 50 km (31 mi) east of the successful Hibernia field and the more recent Terra Nova field. All three fields are in the Jeanne d'Arc Basin on the eastern edge of the famous Grand Banks fishing territory.

SeaRose made her way from the Samsung Heavy Industries shipyard in Geoje South Korea to Marystown, Newfoundland, for final preparation, in April 2004; a 14,000 nmi (26,000 km; 16,000 mi) trip that took two months. In August 2005 she left Marystown for her work duty at Cenovus Energy's White Rose oil field.

In January 2018, the C-NLOPB suspended White Rose operations because of Husky's failure to disconnect when an iceberg approached, contrary to Husky's ice management plan.

In June 2024, SeaRose has undergone refit in drydock at the Harland & Wolff shipyard in Belfast as part of a life extension program, ending in October of the same year.

The ship has since returned to its laydown area near the White Rose field, off the coast of Newfoundland and Labrador, and was reconnected to the infrastructure.
