= List of equipment of the Canadian Coast Guard =

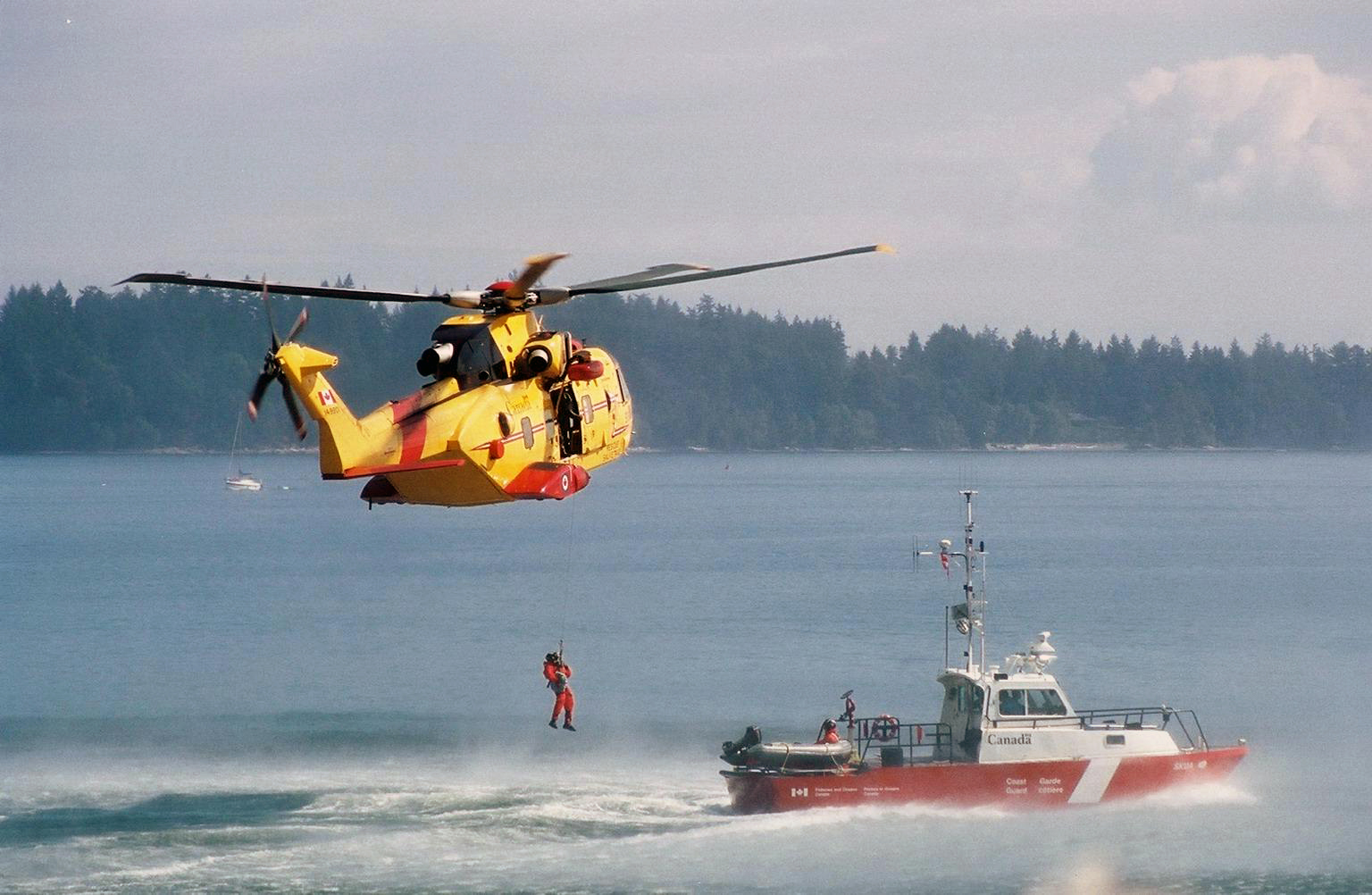
A CCG cutter exercising with a Royal Canadian Air Force CH-149 Cormorant

The Canadian Coast Guard (CCG) maintains a fleet of sea- and lake-going vessels, hovercraft, and aircraft. The variety of equipment allows the CCG to perform its mandated functions of navaids and sea-going transportation management, search and rescue, marine pollution response and the support of other Canadian federal authorities.

== Vessels ==
The Fleet Directorate of the Canadian Coast Guard (CCG) is responsible for all ships and their manning requirements. As of October 2022, it manages and operates a fleet of 123 vessels in support of: CCG aids to navigation; icebreaking; environmental response; and search and rescue (SAR). The CCG fleet also supports Department of Fisheries and Oceans's Fisheries Conservation and Protection and Marine Science programs.

The ships, ranging from search and rescue lifeboats to icebreakers, are tasked to various programs, often concurrently, and are crewed by 2,400 skilled seagoing personnel. Most vessels have between 4 and 30+ crewmembers.

All CCG vessels are painted uniformly regardless of their use. They are characterized by a red hull and white superstructure, designed to look like a "floating Canadian flag". Their hulls bear a (primarily) white stripe raked forward at a 60-degree angle on each side forward. Larger vessels display a red maple leaf on the funnel. Ship nameplates are typically affixed to the superstructure, and vessels are typically named for persons or places of historic or geographic significance.

Throughout the 1960s–1990s, the CCG painted primary SAR vessels in a different colour scheme: bright mustard yellow superstructure and maple leaf red hull, meant to distinguish them from navaid tenders and icebreakers, and also to improve their visibility on the open ocean in breaking waves. Today, the only distinguishing markings for primary SAR vessels is the large RESCUE-SAUVETAGE lettering on the superstructure. Vessels carry the "Canada" 'federal wordmark', which incorporates the duotone version of the national flag. The words Coast Guard/Garde Cotière appear side by side on the hull.

The prefix "Canadian Coast Guard Ship", abbreviated CCGS, is affixed to all vessels. Minor vessels such as patrol boats and lifeboats carried the prefix "Canadian Coast Guard Cutter", abbreviated CCGC in the past, however, this is no longer the case.

The list of various classes of CCG vessels includes:

=== Icebreakers ===
==== Polar icebreakers ====
A new class of icebreakers under the National Shipbuilding Strategy, with the first vessel expected to enter service in 2030.

List of Polar Class icebreakers
Class	Ship	Launched	Commissioned	Displacement	Type	Homeport	Builder	Status
Polar Icebreaker class	CCGS Arpatuuq	(TBD)	Delivery expected by 2030	22,800 tonnes	Polar Class 2	(TBD)	Helsinki Shipyard, Davie Shipbuilding	Under construction
Polar Icebreaker class	CCGS Imnaryuaq	(TBD)	Delivery expected 2032	26,036 tonnes	Polar Class 2	CCG Base St. John's	Seaspan ULC	Under construction

==== Heavy icebreaker ====
A very large multitasked icebreaker, approximately 130 metres (430 ft) in length, capable of sustained operations in the Arctic Archipelago over two seasons per year and for escort operations in the Gulf of St. Lawrence and East Coast of Newfoundland. Has a large cargo carrying capacity, a helicopter hangar that will accommodate a CCG helicopter, and carry multiple utility craft. Named after a former Canadian prime minister and the late cancer research activist Terry Fox. Formerly referred to as Type 1300.

List of heavy icebreakers
Class	Ship	Launched	Commissioned	Displacement	Type	Homeport	Status
Louis S. St-Laurent class	CCGS Louis S. St-Laurent	June 1966	1969	15,324 tonnes	Polar Class 4	CCG Base St. John's	Active
Terry Fox class	CCGS Terry Fox	April 1983	1991	4,234 tonnes	Arctic Class 4	CCG Base St. John's	Active

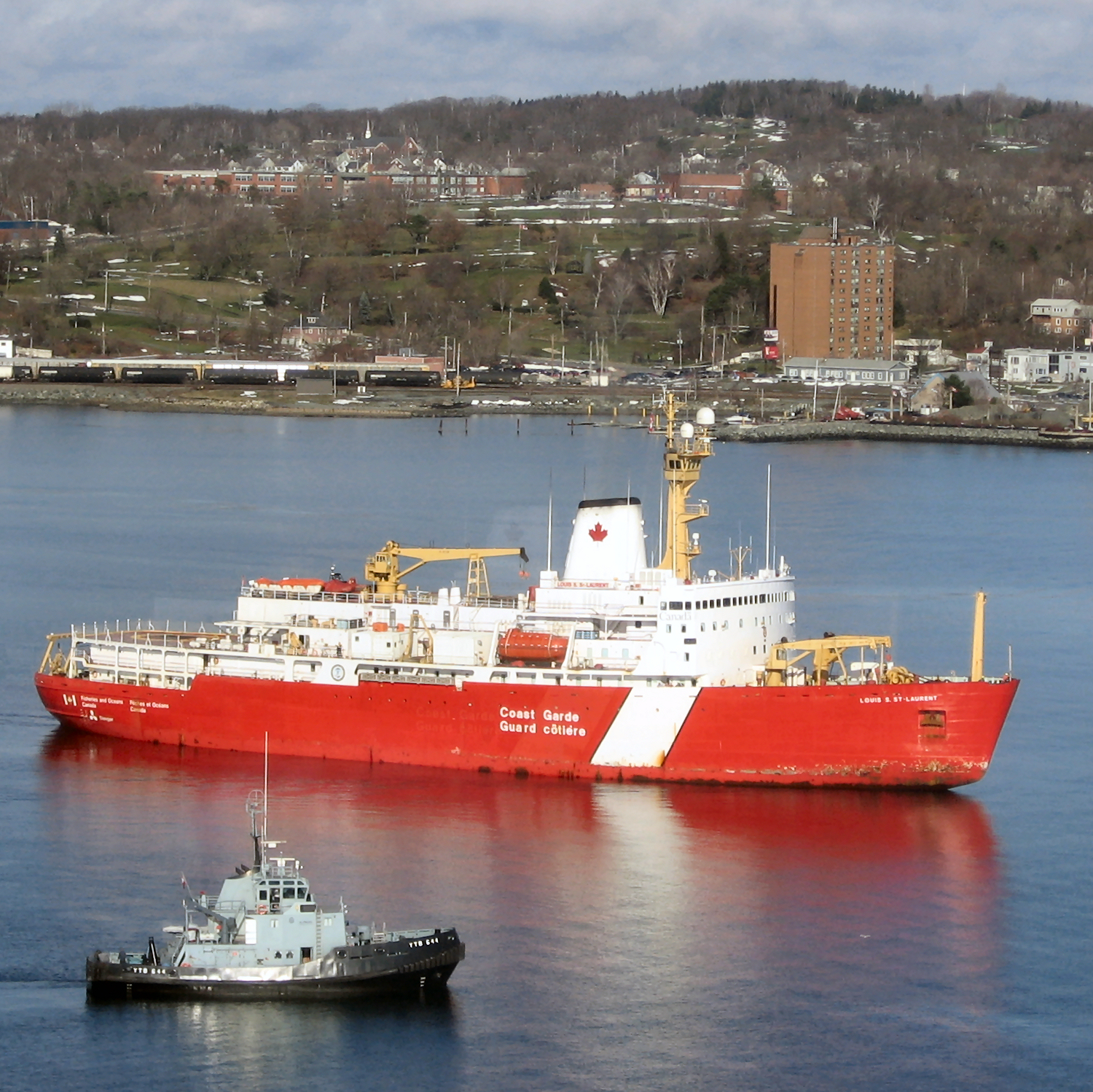
CCGS Louis S. St-Laurent

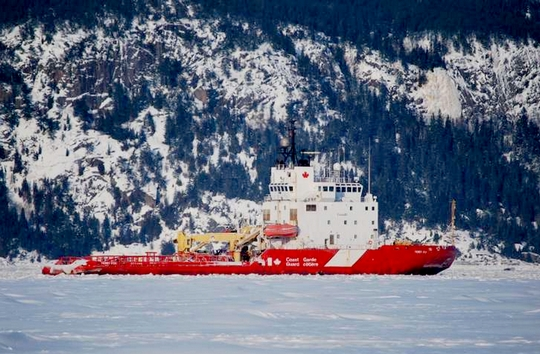
CCGS Terry Fox

==== Medium icebreaker ====
A large icebreaker, approximately 100 metres (330 ft) in length, capable of sustained icebreaking and escort operations in the Arctic Archipelago over two seasons per year, the Great Lakes, St. Lawrence River and Gulf of St. Lawrence and Atlantic Coast in winter. Has a cargo carrying capacity and carry multiple utility craft. Some may incorporate a helicopter hangar to accommodate a CCG helicopter. Has the capability to deliver many Government of Canada programs such as many CCG programs and scientific missions. Formerly referred to as Type 1200.

List of medium icebreakers
Class	Ship	Launched	Commissioned	Displacement	Type	Homeport	Status
Pierre Radisson class	CCGS Pierre Radisson	June 1977	June 1978	5,910 tonnes	Arctic Class 3	CCG Base Quebec	Active
Pierre Radisson class	CCGS Amundsen	January 1977	March 1979	5,910 tonnes	Arctic Class 3	CCG Base Quebec	Active
Pierre Radisson class	CCGS Des Groseilliers	February 1982	August 1982	5,910 tonnes	Arctic Class 3	CCG Base Quebec	Active
Pierre Radisson class	CCGS Henry Larsen	January 1987	June 1988	5,910 tonnes	Arctic Class 3	CCG Base St. John's	Active
Project Resolute
Project Resolute	CCGS Captain Molly Kool	February 2001	May 2019	6,872 tonnes	ICE-10 Icebreaker	CCG Base St. John's	Active
Project Resolute	CCGS Jean Goodwill	October 2000	November 2020	6,872 tonnes	ICE-10 Icebreaker	CCG Base Dartmouth	Active
Project Resolute	CCGS Vincent Massey	March 2000	October 2022	6,872 tonnes	ICE-10 Icebreaker	CCG Base Quebec	Active

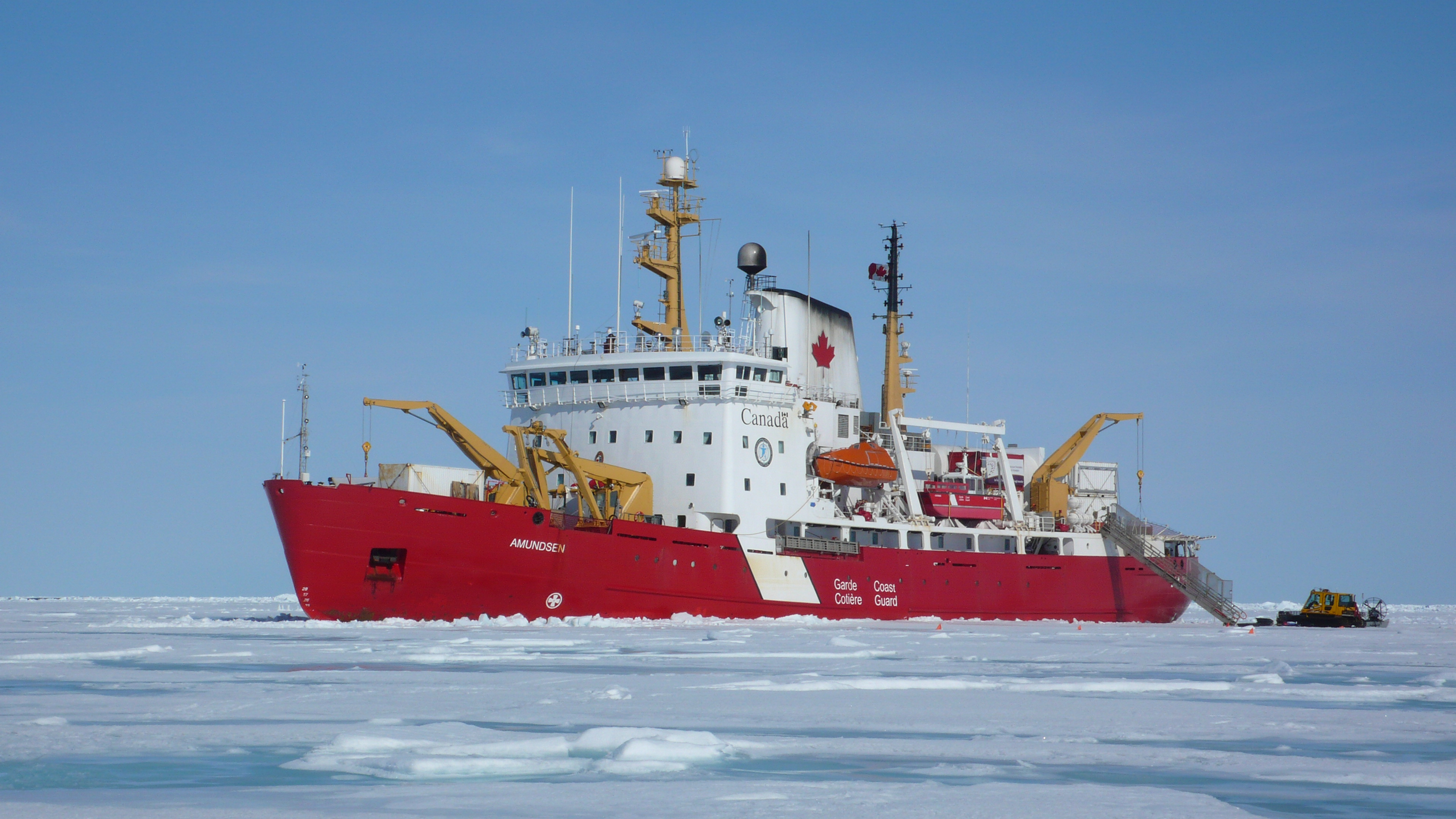
CCGS Amundsen

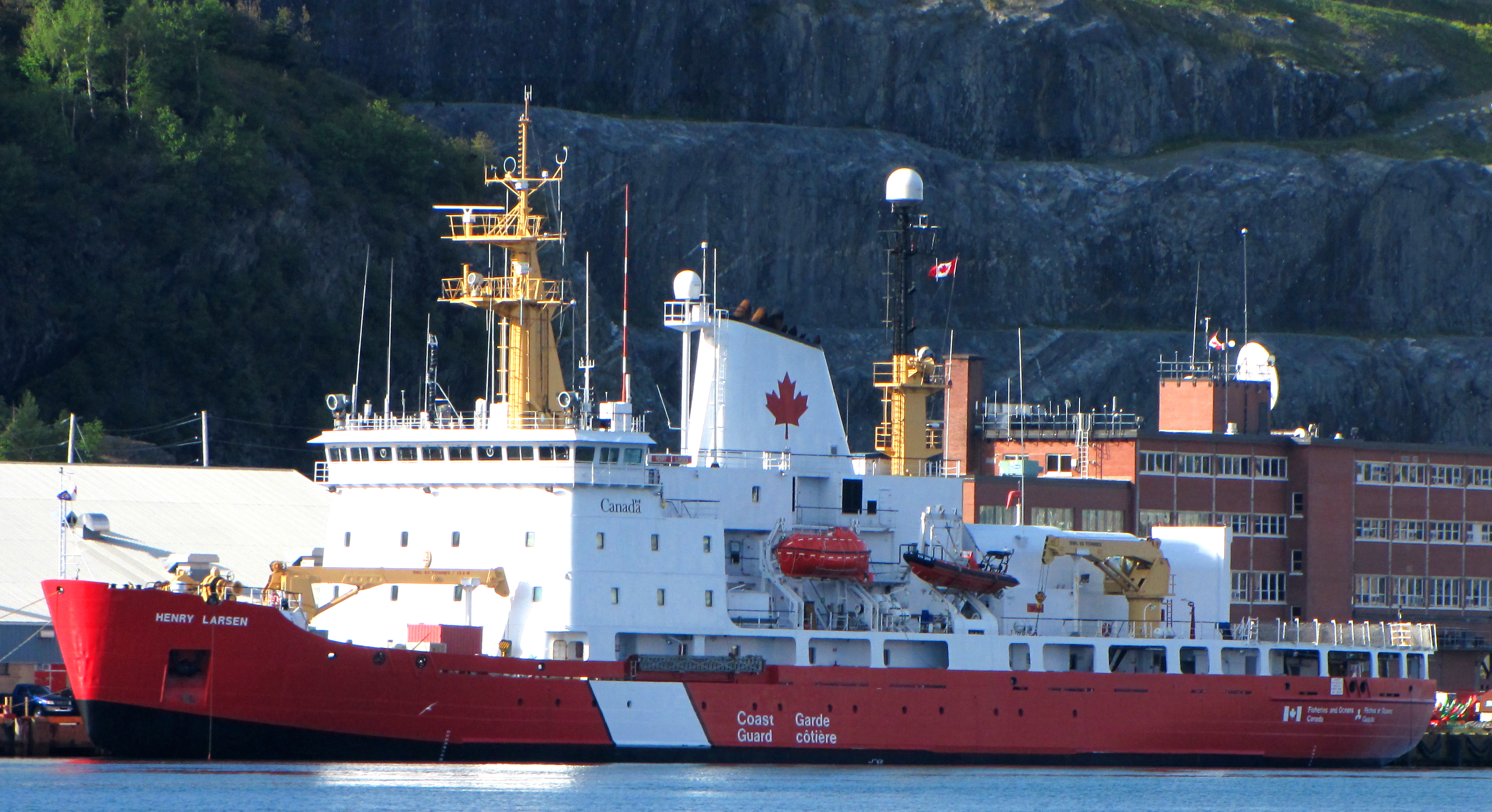
CCGS Henry Larsen

=== Multi-tasked ===
==== Multi-purpose Icebreaker ====
List of Multi-purpose vessels
Class	Ship	Launched	Commissioned	Displacement	Type	Homeport	Status
Multi-purpose vessels - Flight I	(Ships to be named)	(TBD)	(TBD)	~8,987 tonnes	Polar Class 4	(TBD)	Production Design
Multi-purpose vessels - Flight II	(Ships to be named)	(TBD)	(TBD)	(TBD)	(TBD)	(TBD)	Concept
Multi-purpose vessels - Flight III	(Ships to be named)	(TBD)	(TBD)	(TBD)	(TBD)	(TBD)	Concept

==== High endurance multi-tasked vessel ====
A large highly adaptable multi-tasked vessel, approximately 85 metres (279 ft) long, with an icebreaking capability to work in the southern and western Arctic, for escort operations in the Great Lakes, St. Lawrence River and Gulf of St. Lawrence and Atlantic Coast in winter. Has a shallower draught than the medium icebreaker and is less capable overall. Has a crane, a large cargo hold and deck capacity, has a helicopter hangar that will accommodate a CCG helicopter, can launch and recover rigid-hulled inflatable boats and two utility craft. Has the capability to deliver many Government of Canada programs. Formerly referred to as Type 1100.

List of high endurance multi-tasked vessels
Class	Ship	Launched	Commissioned	Displacement	Type	Homeport	Status
-	CCGS Griffon	September 1969	December 1970	3,096 tonnes	Arctic Class 2	CCG Base Prescott	Active
Martha L. Black class
Martha L. Black class	CCGS Martha L. Black	September 1985	April 1986	4,737 tonnes	Arctic Class 2	CCG Base Quebec	Active
Martha L. Black class	CCGS George R. Pearkes	November 1985	April 1986	4,737 tonnes	Arctic Class 2	CCG Base St. John's	Active
Martha L. Black class	CCGS Sir Wilfrid Laurier	December 1985	November 1986	4,737 tonnes	Arctic Class 2	CCG Base Victoria	Active
Martha L. Black class	CCGS Kopit Hopson 1752 (ex-Edward Cornwallis)	February 1986	August 1986	4,737 tonnes	Arctic Class 2	CCG Base Dartmouth	Active
Martha L. Black class	CCGS Sir William Alexander	October 1986	February 1987	4,737 tonnes	Arctic Class 2	CCG Base Dartmouth	Active
Martha L. Black class	CCGS Ann Harvey	December 1985	June 1987	4,737 tonnes	Arctic Class 2	CCG Base St. John's	Active

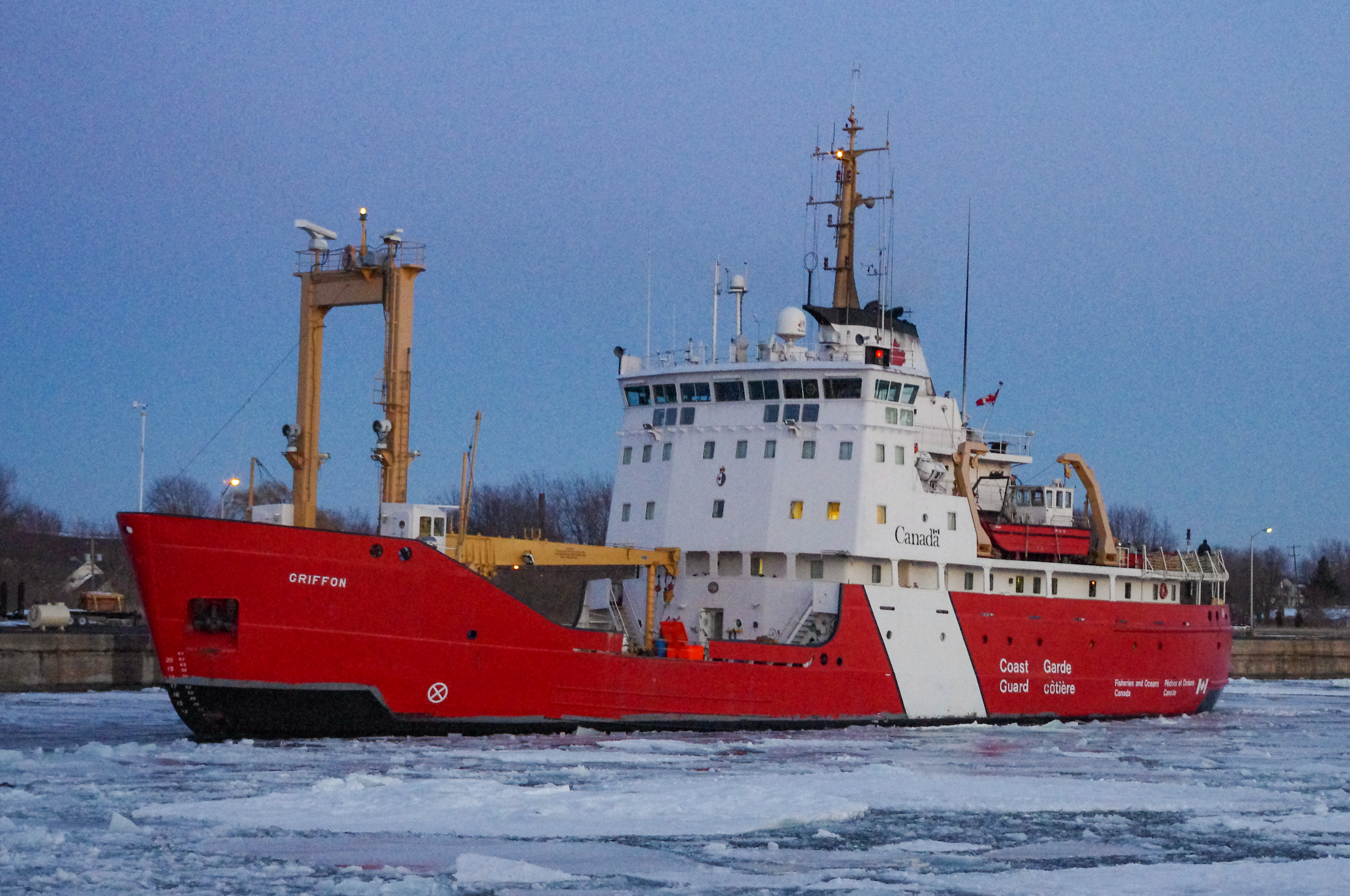
CCGS Griffon

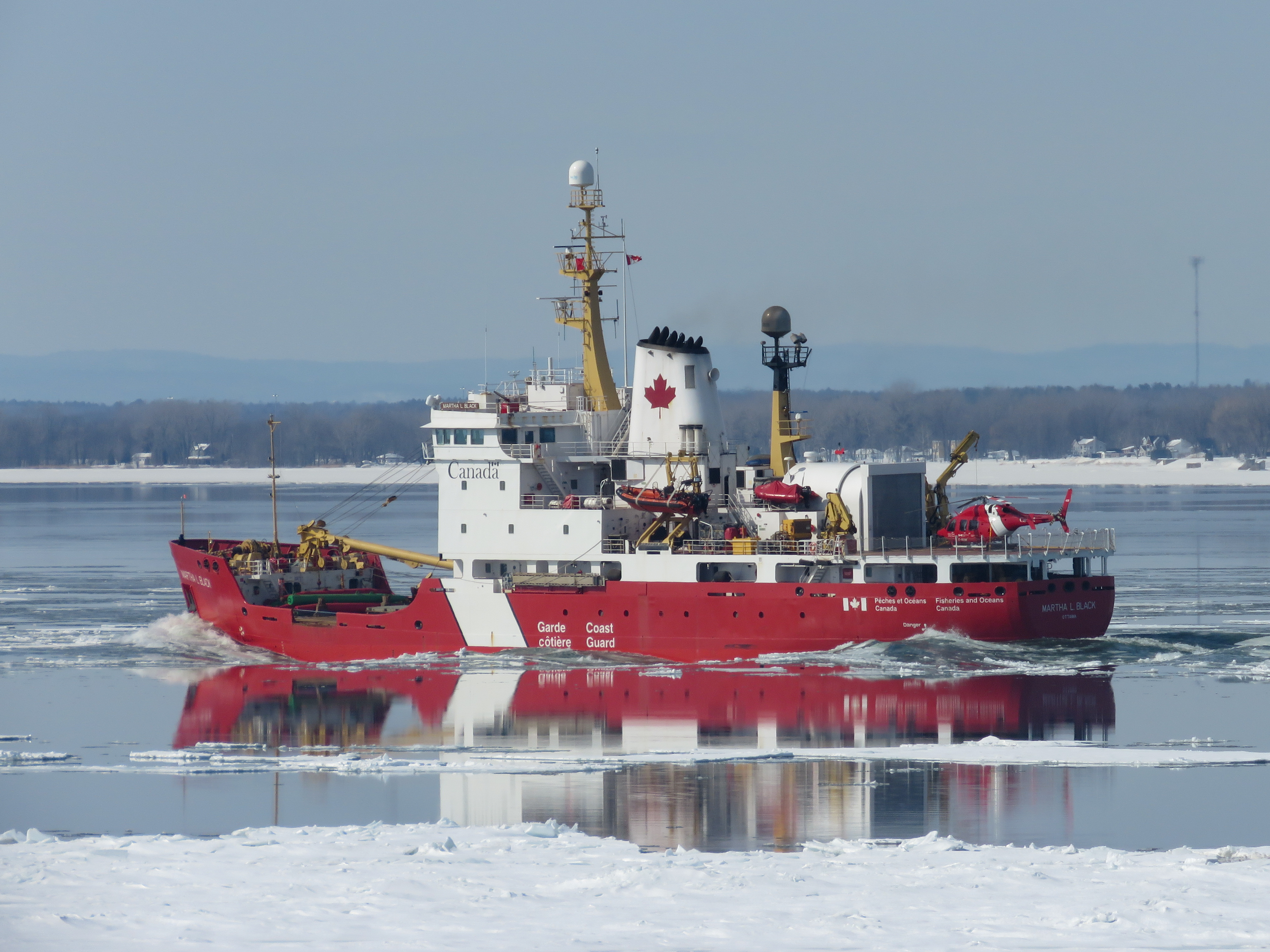
CCGS Martha L. Black

==== Medium endurance multi-tasked vessel ====
A large multi-tasked shallow draught vessel, approximately 65 metres (213 ft) long, with a top speed of 14 knots (26 km/h; 16 mph) that can stay at sea up to 28 days. Has a crane, a large cargo hold and deck area, can launch and recover rigid-hull inflatable boats and utility craft. Primarily used for aids to navigation, search and rescue, science and environmental response and has some icebreaking capability. Designed to have a helicopter deck but not generally equipped with one. Named after former Canadian mariners or members of the CCG who have made a significant contribution. Formerly referred to as Type 1050 and 1000.

List of medium endurance multi-tasked vessels
Class	Ship	Launched	Commissioned	Displacement	Type	Homeport	Status
Samuel Risley class	CCGS Samuel Risley	(TBD)	April 1985	2,935 tonnes	Light icebreaker (CASPPR Arctic Class 2) / buoy tender	CCG Base Parry Sound	Active
Samuel Risley class	CCGS Earl Grey	(TBD)	May 1986	2,935 tonnes	Light icebreaker (CASPPR Arctic Class 2) / buoy tender	CCG Base Charlottetown	Active
Interim light icebreaker	CCGS Judy LaMarsh	2010	(TBD)	Unknown	Shallow-draught icebreaker	CCG Base Prescott	Refit and conversion

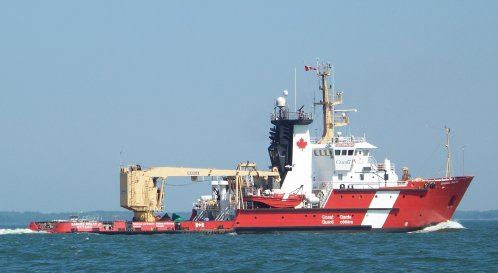
CCGS Samuel Risley

=== Science vessels ===
==== Offshore oceanographic science vessel ====
List of offshore oceanographic science vessels
Ship	Launched	Commissioned	Displacement	Type	Homeport	Status
CCGS John P. Tully	December 1984	1985	1,800 tonnes	Research vessel	CCG Base Patricia Bay	Active
CCGS Naalak Nappaaluk	August 2024	2025	5,085 tonnes	Research vessel	Dartmouth (Halifax) Nova Scotia	Active

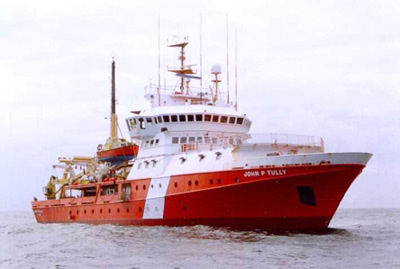
CCGS John P. Tully

==== Offshore fisheries science vessels ====
Offshore fisheries science platforms for Fisheries and Oceans Canada, equipped to carry out fisheries science research missions, serving an important role in monitoring the health of fish stocks, understanding the impacts of climate change, and supporting science that allows us to better understand our oceans. The vessels are named after former scientists or explorers who have made a significant contribution.

List of offshore fisheries science vessels
Class	Ship	Launched	Commissioned	Displacement	Type	Homeport	Status
Alfred Needler class	CCGS Teleost	March 1988	1996	2,405 tonnes	Fisheries research vessel	CCG Base St. John's	Active
Sir John Franklin class	CCGS Sir John Franklin	December 2017	June 2019	3,212 tonnes	Fisheries research vessel	CCG Base Patricia Bay	Active
Sir John Franklin class	CCGS Capt. Jacques Cartier	June 2019	2020	3,212 tonnes	Fisheries research vessel	CCG Base Dartmouth	Active
Sir John Franklin class	CCGS John Cabot	2020	2020	3,212 tonnes	Fisheries research vessel	CCG Base St. John's	Active

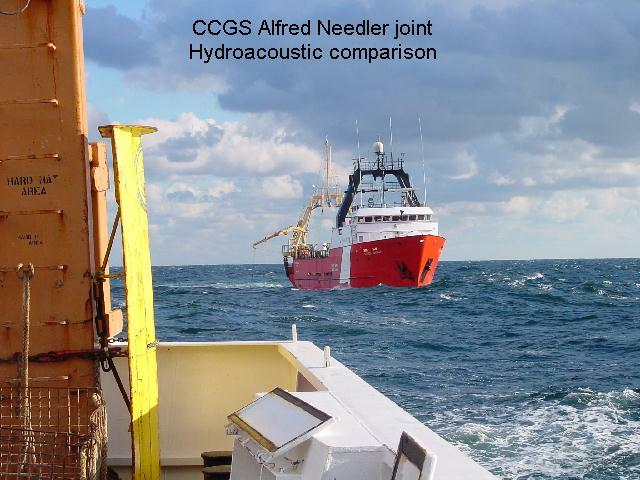
CCGS Alfred Needler

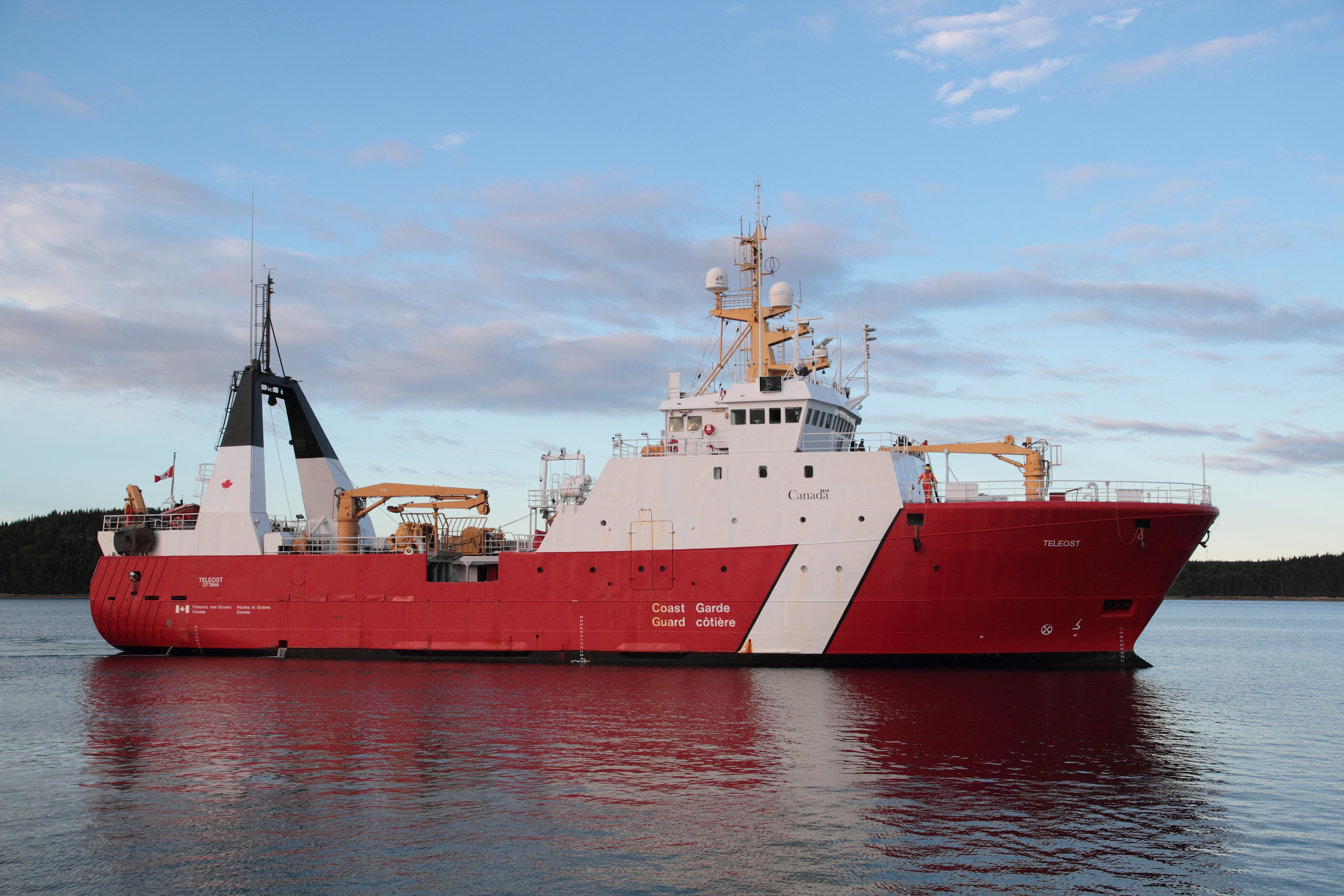
CCGS Teleost

==== Mid-shore science vessel ====
Medium sized vessel, approximately 40 metres long, capable of sustained operations away from port for up to 14 days, has endurance for 21 days and a top speed of 12–14 knots (22–26 km/h; 14–16 mph) with a cruising range of 4,000 nautical miles (7,400 km; 4,600 mi), has minimal ice capability to transit light ice-infested waters. No helicopter capability and limited capacity to carry survey launches. Primarily used for limited ecosystem fishery science, oceanographic missions and geological/hydrographic surveys. Named after former Dominion hydrographers of Canada or former explorers of Canada.

List of Mid-shore Science Vessels
Ship	Launched	Commissioned	Displacement	Type	Homeport	Status
CCGS Limnos	1968	1968	-	Coastal research and survey vessel	CCG Base Burlington	Active
CCGS Otter Bay	1992	1992	-	Coastal research and survey vessel	CCG Base Victoria	Active
CCGS Vector	May 1967	1967	-	Coastal research and survey vessel	CCG Base Patricia Bay	Active

==== Near-shore fisheries research vessel ====
Small, approximately 20–25 metres (66–82 ft) long, fishery research vessel with a 3–4 metres (9.8–13.1 ft) draught, a speed of 12 knots with a moderate range. Has minimal ice capability to transit light ice-infested waters. Has some lab capacity and has no helicopter capability. Used to conduct trawl surveys. Named after former Canadians who have made a contribution to marine and fishery research or fisheries management.

List of Near-shore Fisheries Research Vessels
Ship	Launched	Commissioned	Displacement	Type	Homeport	Status
CCGS Leim	2012	2012	-	Research vessel	CCG Base Sorel-Tracy	Active
CCGS M. Perley	2012	2012	-	Research vessel	CCG Base Dartmouth	Active
CCGS Neocaligus	1989	1989	-	Research vessel	CCG Base Patricia Bay	Active
CCGS Vladykov	2012	2012	-	Research vessel	CCG Base St. John's	Active

=== Patrol vessels ===
==== Offshore patrol vessel ====
A large offshore vessel, approximately 75 metres (246 ft) long, that can operate beyond 120 nautical miles (220 km; 140 mi) including outside the exclusive economic zone, has a top speed greater than 20–25 knots (37–46 km/h; 23–29 mph) and can stay at sea for up to six weeks. Can operate year-round in Canadian waters, except the Arctic archipelago, and has a minimal ice capability to transit light ice-infested waters. Carries two rigid-hulled inflatable boats, up to 11 metres (36 ft) long, can accommodate a helicopter with minimal hangar capabilities. Designed to support law enforcement, and has a program operations room. Primarily used for fisheries enforcement and search and rescue. Named after Former Companions of the Order of Canada.

List of Offshore Patrol Vessels
Class	Ship	Launched	Commissioned	Displacement	Type	Homeport	Status
Cape Roger class	CCGS Cape Roger	June 1976	August 1977	1,489 tonnes	Fisheries patrol vessel	CCG Base St. John's	Active
Cape Roger class	CCGS Cygnus	July 1981	May 1981	1,489 tonnes	Fisheries patrol vessel	CCG Base St. John's	Active
Other	CCGS Gordon Reid	June 1990	October 1990	879 tonnes	Fisheries patrol vessel	CCG Base Patricia Bay	Active
Other	CCGS Leonard J. Cowley	November 1984	1984	2,080 tonnes	Fisheries patrol vessel	CCG Base St. John's	Active
Other	CCGS Sir Wilfred Grenfell	1985	December 1987	3,813 tones	Offshore supply and search and rescue vessel	CCG Base Victoria	Active
Other	CCGS Tanu	1968	September 1968	940 tonnes	Fisheries patrol vessel	CCG Base Patricia Bay	Active
Other	5 ships to be named	(TBD)	(TBD)	(TBD)	Multi-purpose vessel	TBD	(Unknown)
Future Arctic and Offshore Patrol Ships	CCGS Donjek	April 2026	Expected 2026	~6,667 tonnes	Arctic and ofshore patrol vessel	(TBD)	Launched and awaiting sea trials.
Future Arctic and Offshore Patrol Ships	CCGS Sermilik	(TBD)	Expected 2027	~6,667 tonnes	Arctic and offshore patrol vessel	(TBD)	Construction

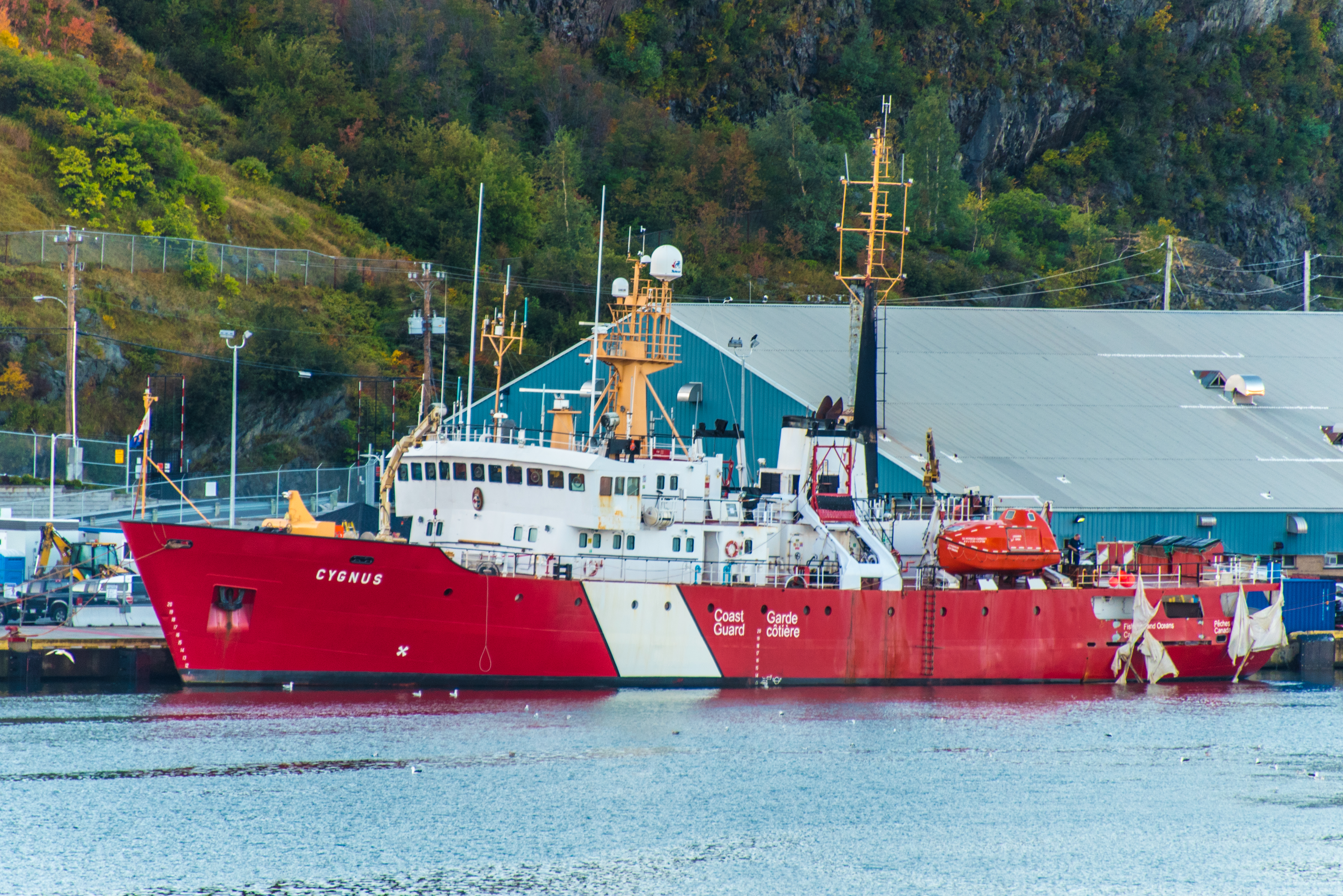
CCGS Cygnus

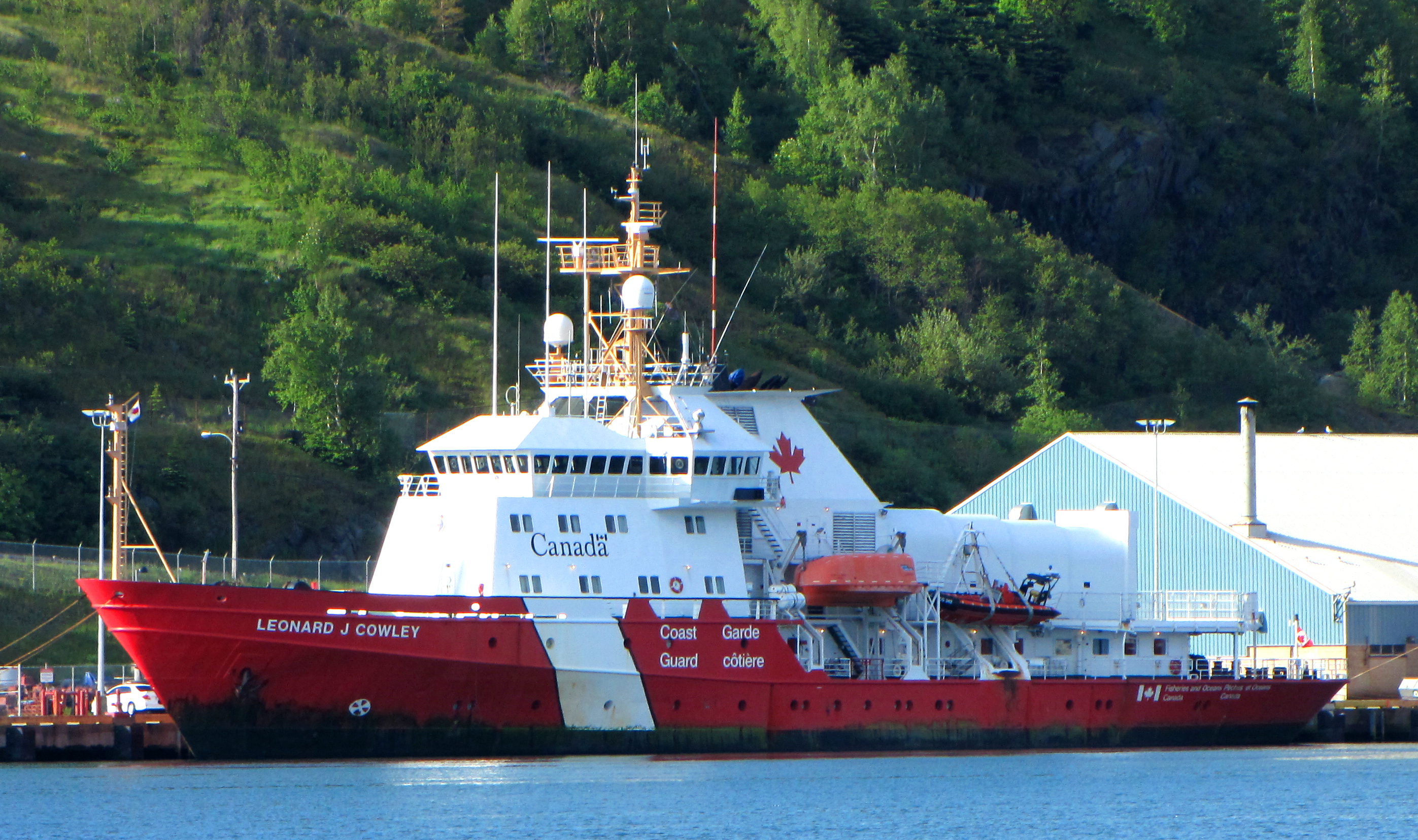
CCGS Leonard J. Cowley

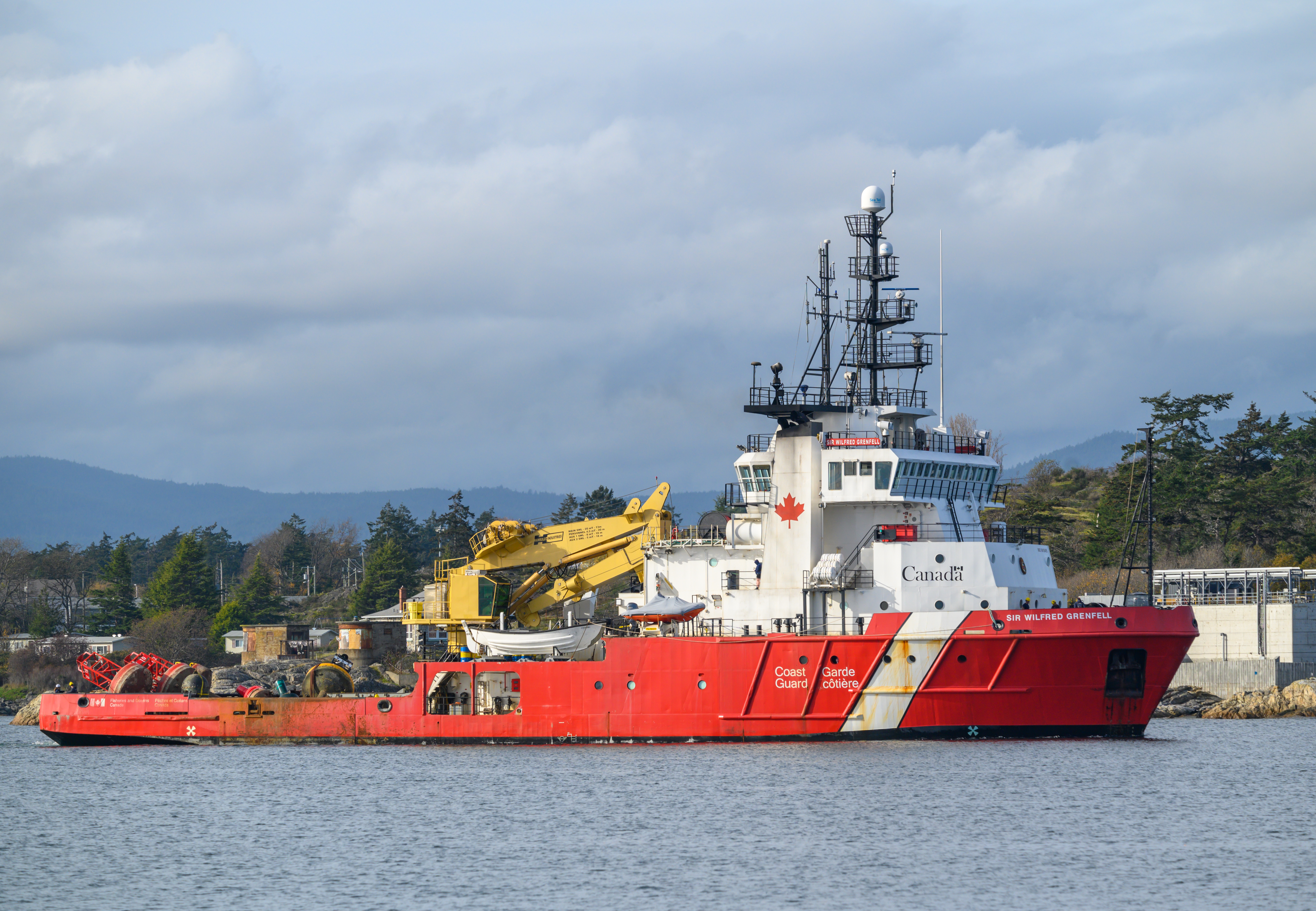
CCGS Sir Wilfred Grenfell

==== Mid-shore patrol vessel ====
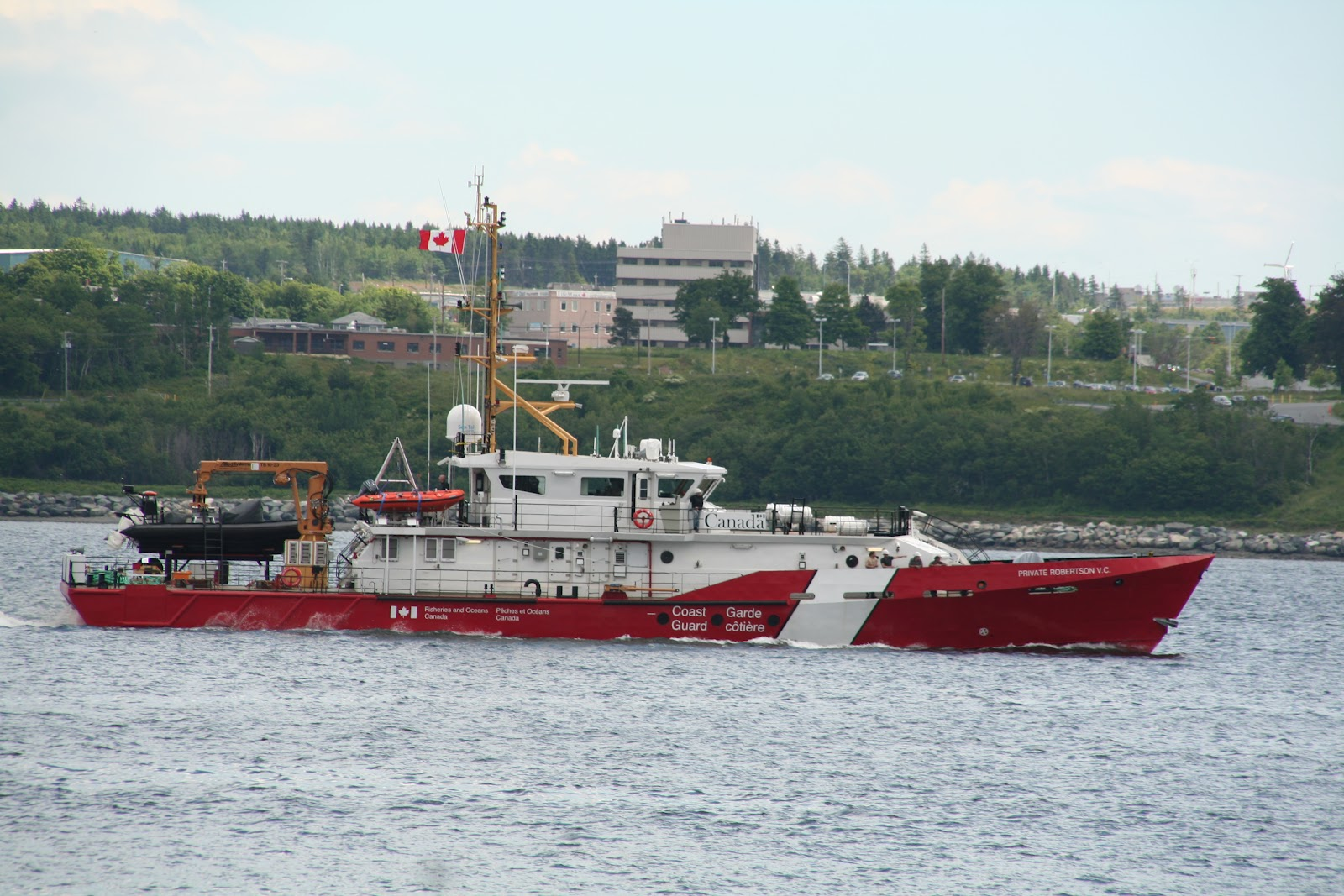
CCGS Private Robertson V.C.

A medium sized vessel, approximately 40 metres (130 ft) long, that can operate up to 120 nautical miles offshore with a top speed of 25 knots and stay at sea up to 14 days. No requirement for operations in ice-infested waters. Carries one or two rigid-hull inflatable boats with no helicopter capabilities. Primarily used for maritime security and fisheries enforcement. Named after former winners of the Victoria Cross, Star of Military Valour, Medal of Military Valour, Meritorious Service Medal, Star of Courage, Medal of Bravery, Order of Merit of the Police Forces, Royal Canadian Mounted Police Role of Honour of Department of Fisheries and Oceans or CCG members who died in the line of duty.

List of mid-shore patrol vessels
Class	Ship	Launched	Commissioned	Displacement	Type	Homeport	Status
Hero class	CCGS Private Robertson V.C.	May 2012	July 2012	-	Patrol vessel	CCG Base Patricia Bay	Active
Hero class	CCGS Caporal Kaeble V.C.	September 2012	November 2012	-	Patrol vessel	CCG IRB Station Quebec	Active
Hero class	CCGS Corporal Teather C.V.	December 2012	February 2013	-	Patrol vessel	CCG Base Dartmouth	Active
Hero class	CCGS Constable Carrière	2013	2013	-	Patrol vessel	CCG IRB Station Quebec	Active
Hero class	CCGS G. Peddle S.C	2013	2013	-	Patrol vessel	CCG Base Dartmouth	Active
Hero class	CCGS A. LeBlanc	January 2014	March 2014	-	Patrol vessel	CCG IRB Station Quebec	Active
Hero class	CCGS M. Charles M.B.	2014	2014	-	Patrol vessel	CCG Station Victoria	Active
Hero class	CCGS Captain Goddard M.S.M.	May 2014	October 2014	-	Patrol vessel	CCG Station Victoria	Active

=== Other ===
==== Emergency towing vessel ====
UT 722 type anchor handling tug supply vessels built in 1999. Owned by Atlantic Towing Limited and on charter for the Canadian Coast Guard in British Columbia.

- CCGS Atlantic Eagle
- CCGS Atlantic Raven
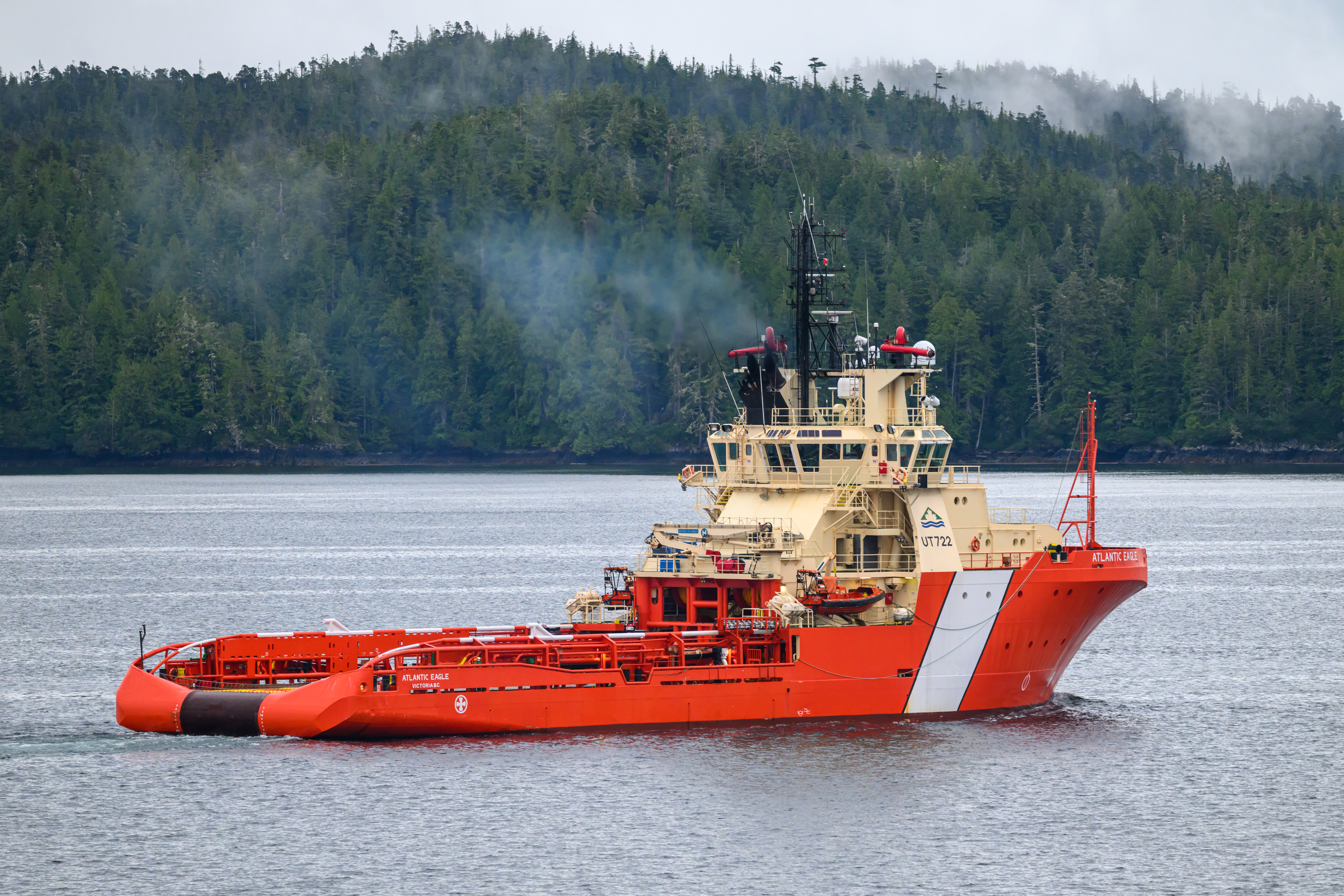
CCGS Atlantic Eagle

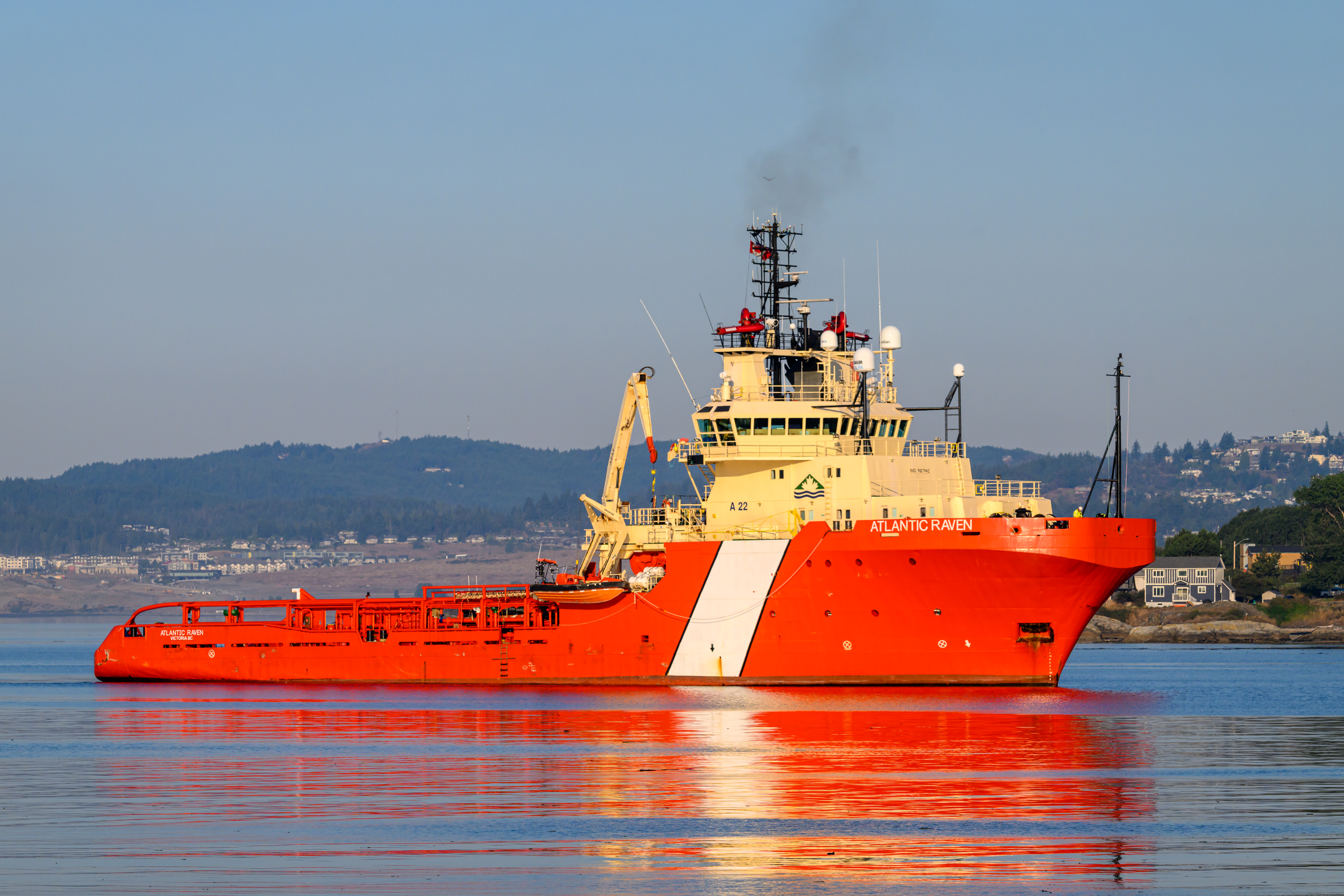
CCGS Atlantic Raven

==== Special navaids vessel ====
A shallow-draft, flat-bottom vessel, approximately 50 metres (160 ft) long, self-supporting for up to 28 days and can sustain repeated groundings due to shifting river channels, not suitable for open-sea work, no icebreaking capabilities. Can accommodate a helicopter with minimal hangar capabilities. Primarily used for navigational aids on the Mackenzie River. Named with Indigenous words.

- CCGS Dumit
- CCGS Eckaloo

==== Channel survey and sounding vessel ====
Small vessel, approximately 20–25 metres long, with sounding speed of 10 knots (19 km/h; 12 mph) with no ice capability. Carries a small utility craft and has no helicopter capability. Primarily used to conduct depth survey operations. Named after former Dominion hydrographers of Canada or former explorers of Canada.

- CCGS Helen Irene Battle
- CCGS Jean Bourdon

==== Air cushion vehicle (hovercraft) ====
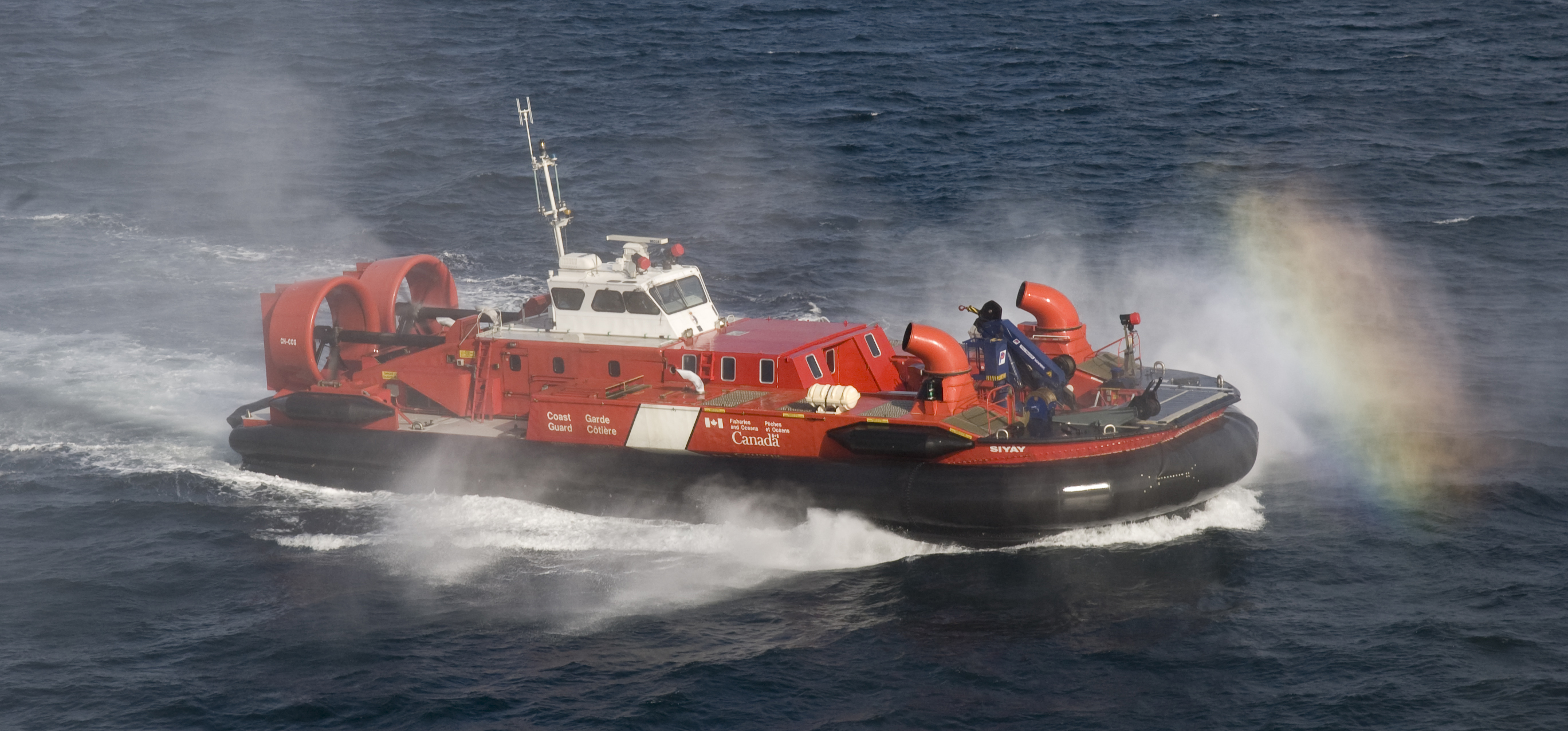
CCGS Siyay

A medium-sized, fast hovercraft, up to 45 knots (83 km/h; 52 mph), multi-tasked vessel which rides on a cushion of air, capable of working in very shallow areas and littoral zones. Has no helicopter capability. Primarily used for search and rescue, aids to navigation, environmental response and icebreaking. Named with Indigenous words.

- CCGS Mamilossa
- CCGS Moytel
- CCGS Sipu Muin
- CCGS Siyay

=== SAR lifeboat (MLBs) ===
Forward view of CCGS McIntyre Bay transiting Porpoise Harbour on a misty day, near Port Edward, British Columbia

Small, approximately 14 to 19 metres (46 to 62 ft) long, shore-based self-righting lifeboat capable of search and rescue operations up to 120 nautical miles (220 km; 140 mi) from shore with a top speed of approximately 25 knots with minimal ice capability to transit light ice-infested waters. No helicopter capability. Named after geographical features uniform by class. Canadian capes for high speed lifeboats (47 feet (14 m) MLBs). Canadian bays for high endurance lifeboats (Arun/Severn design).

CCG maintains 36 14.6-metre (47 ft 11 in) Cape-class motor lifeboats, those listed with the name prefix Cape (or Cap in french). The exception is CCGS Cap Aux Mueles which is one of ten larger (16 metres, 52 ft) motor lifeboats based on Arun-class lifeboats designed in the United Kingdom. In 2015, the CCG embarked on a project to build replacements for the Arun-class lifeboats, using a design based on the later Severn-class lifeboat of the Royal National Lifeboat Institution (RNLI), also designed in the United Kingdom. The first Bay-class lifeboats were delivered in late 2017. The project was completed in late 2025, with the delivery of the final Bay-class lifeboat, CCGS Baie de Gaspé.

==== Arun class ====
- CCGS Bickerton
- CCGS Cap Aux Meules
- CCGS Clarks Harbour
- CCGS Courtney Bay
- CCGS Sambro
- CCGS Spindrift
- CCGS Spray
- CCGS W.G. George
- CCGS W. Jackman
- CCGS Westport

Examples of Arun-class SAR lifeboats

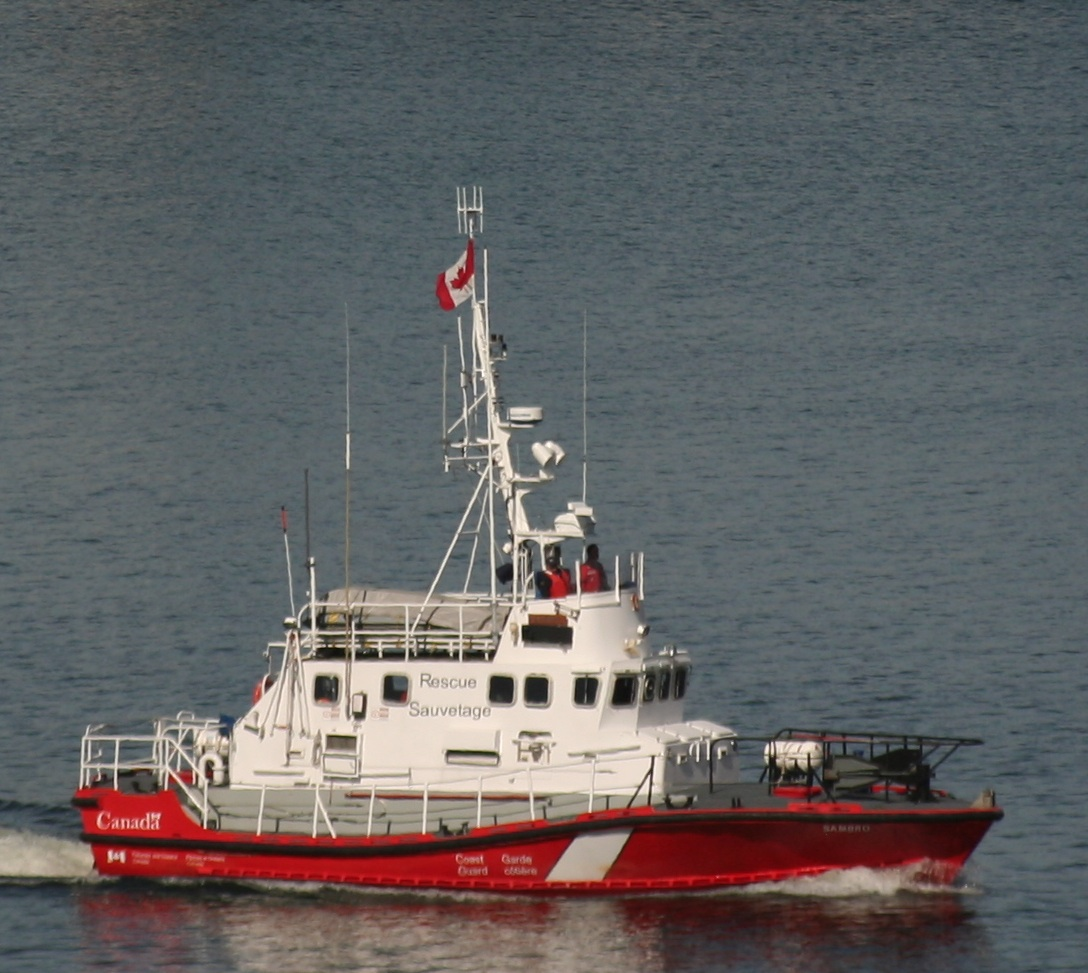
CCGS Sambro

==== Bay class ====
- CCGS Baie de Plaisance
- CCGS Pennant Bay
- CCGS McIntyre Bay
- CCGS Pachena Bay
- CCGS Sacred Bay
- CCGS Conception Bay
- CCGS Cadboro Bay
- CCGS Florencia Bay
- CCGS Hare Bay
- CCGS La Poile Bay
- CCGS Chignecto Bay
- CCGS Shediac Bay
- CCGS Chedabucto Bay
- CCGS Gabarus Bay
- CCGS Barrington Bay
- CCGS Baie des Chaleurs
- CCGS Groswater Bay
- CCGS Cascumpec Bay
- CCGS Mira Bay
- CCGS Baie de Gaspé

Examples of Bay-class SAR lifeboats

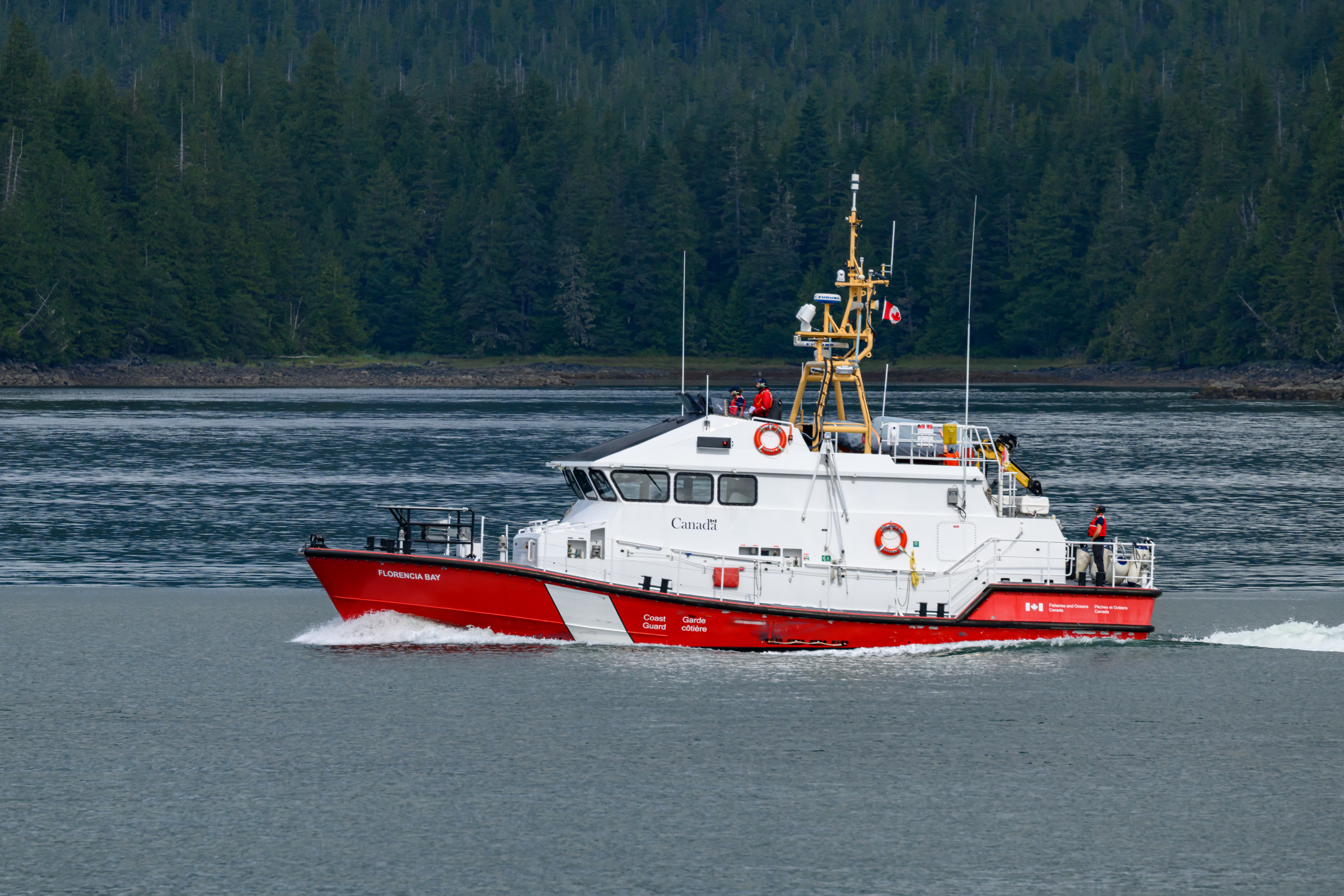
CCGS Florencia Bay

==== Cape class ====
- CCGS Cap Aupaluk
- CCGS Cap Breton
- CCGS Cap D'Espoir
- CCGS Cap De Rabast
- CCGS Cap Nord
- CCGS Cap Percé
- CCGS Cap Rozier
- CCGS Cap Tourmente
- CCGS Cape Ann
- CCGS Cape Calvert
- CCGS Cape Caution
- CCGS Cape Chaillon
- CCGS Cape Cockburn
- CCGS Cape Commodore
- CCGS Cape Dauphin
- CCGS Cape Discovery
- CCGS Cape Dundas
- CCGS Cape Edensaw
- CCGS Cape Farewell
- CCGS Cape Fox
- CCGS Cape Hearne
- CCGS Cape Kuper
- CCGS Cape Lambton
- CCGS Cape McKay
- CCGS Cape Mercy
- CCGS Cape Mudge
- CCGS Cape Naden
- CCGS Cape Norman
- CCGS Cape Palmerston
- CCGS Cape Providence
- CCGS Cape Rescue
- CCGS Cape Spry
- CCGS Cape St. James
- CCGS Cape Storm
- CCGS Cape Sutil
- CCGS Thunder Cape

Examples of Cape-class SAR lifeboats

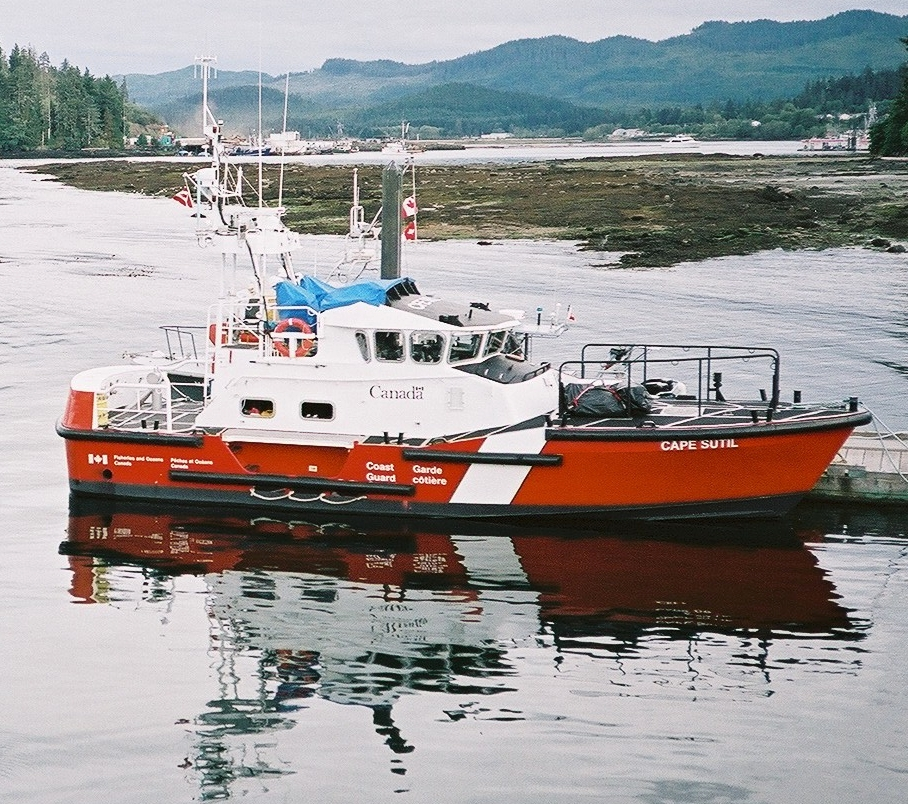
CCGS Cape Sutil

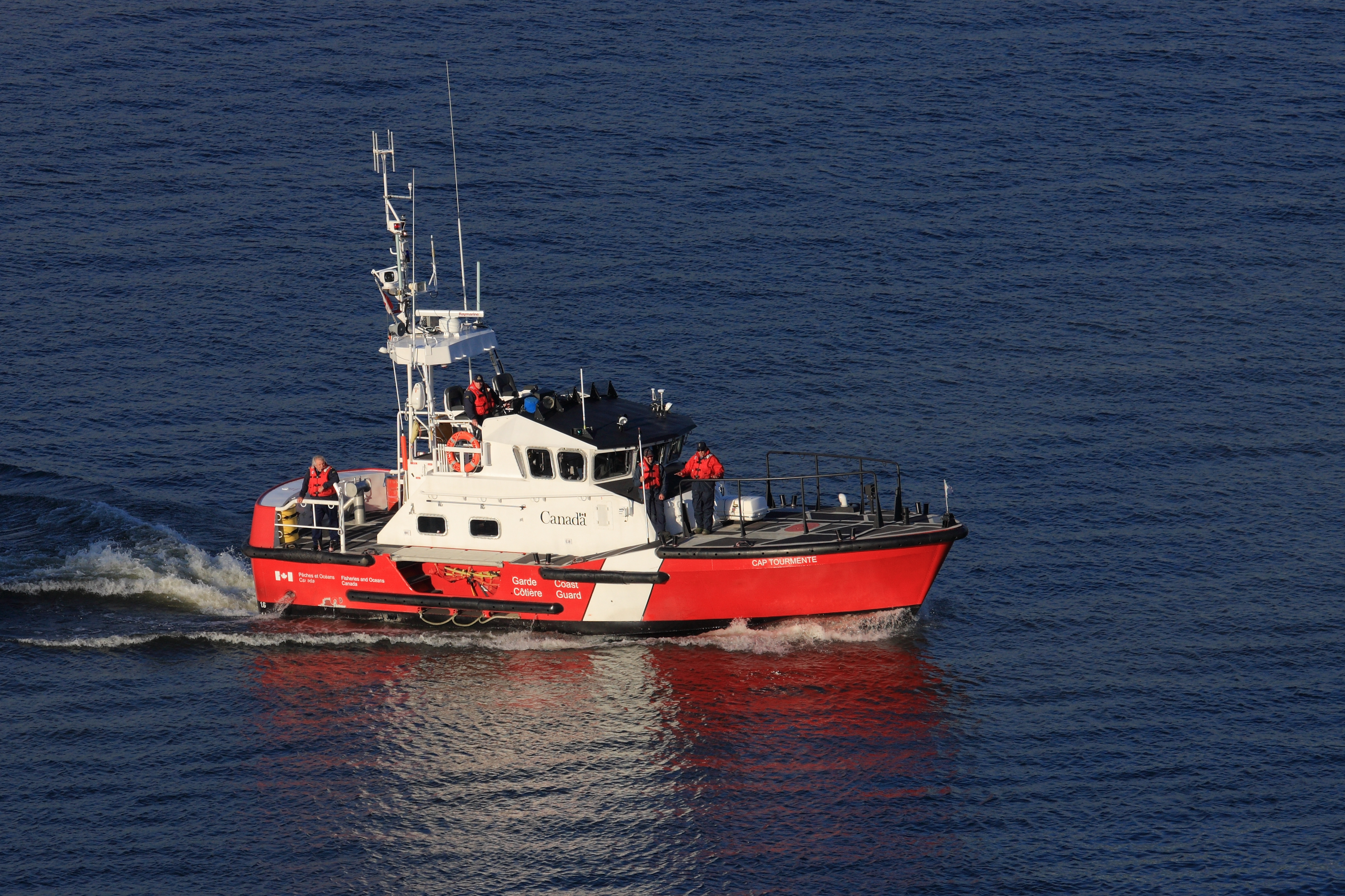
CCGS Cap Tourmente

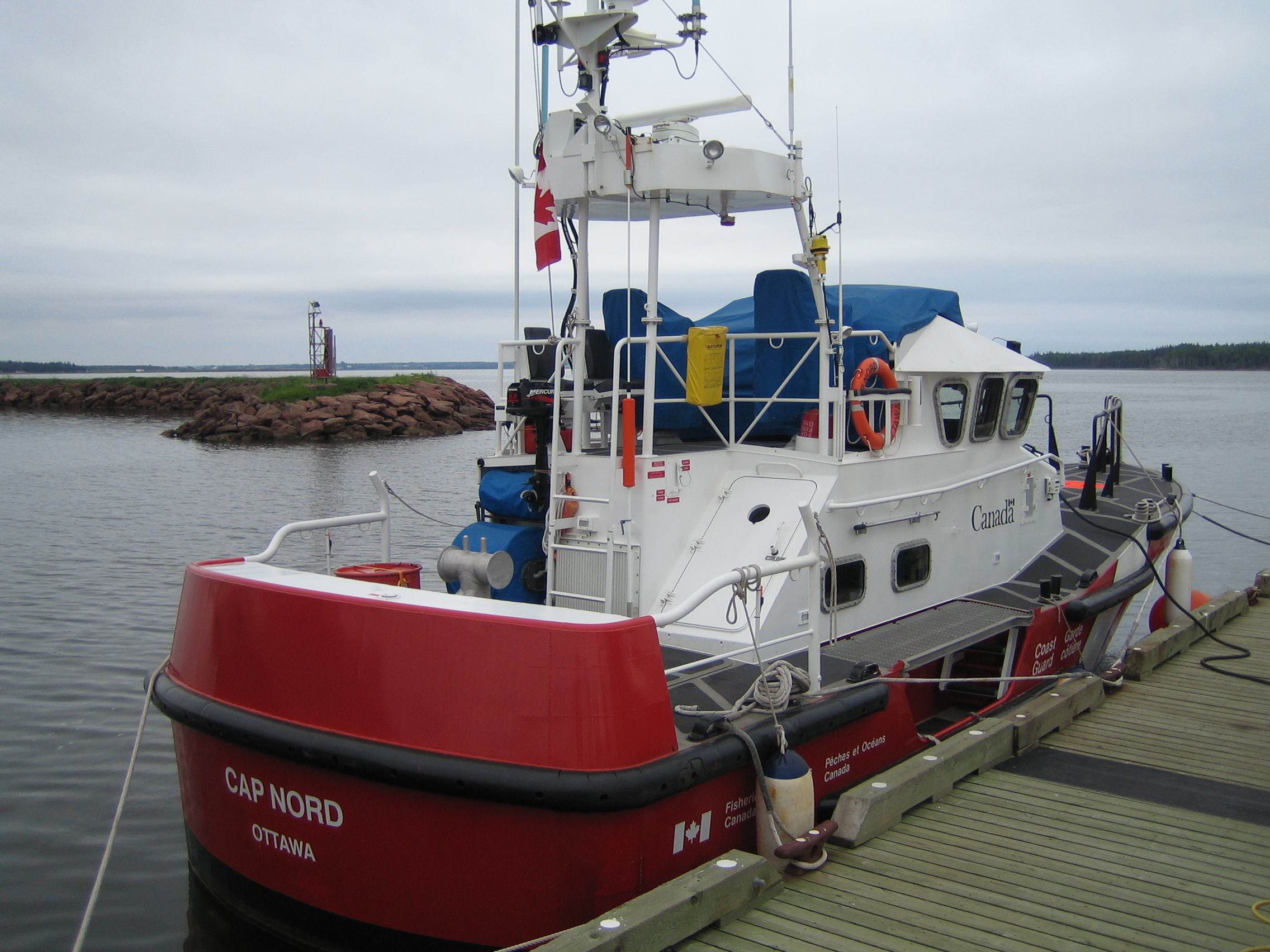
CCGS Cap Nord

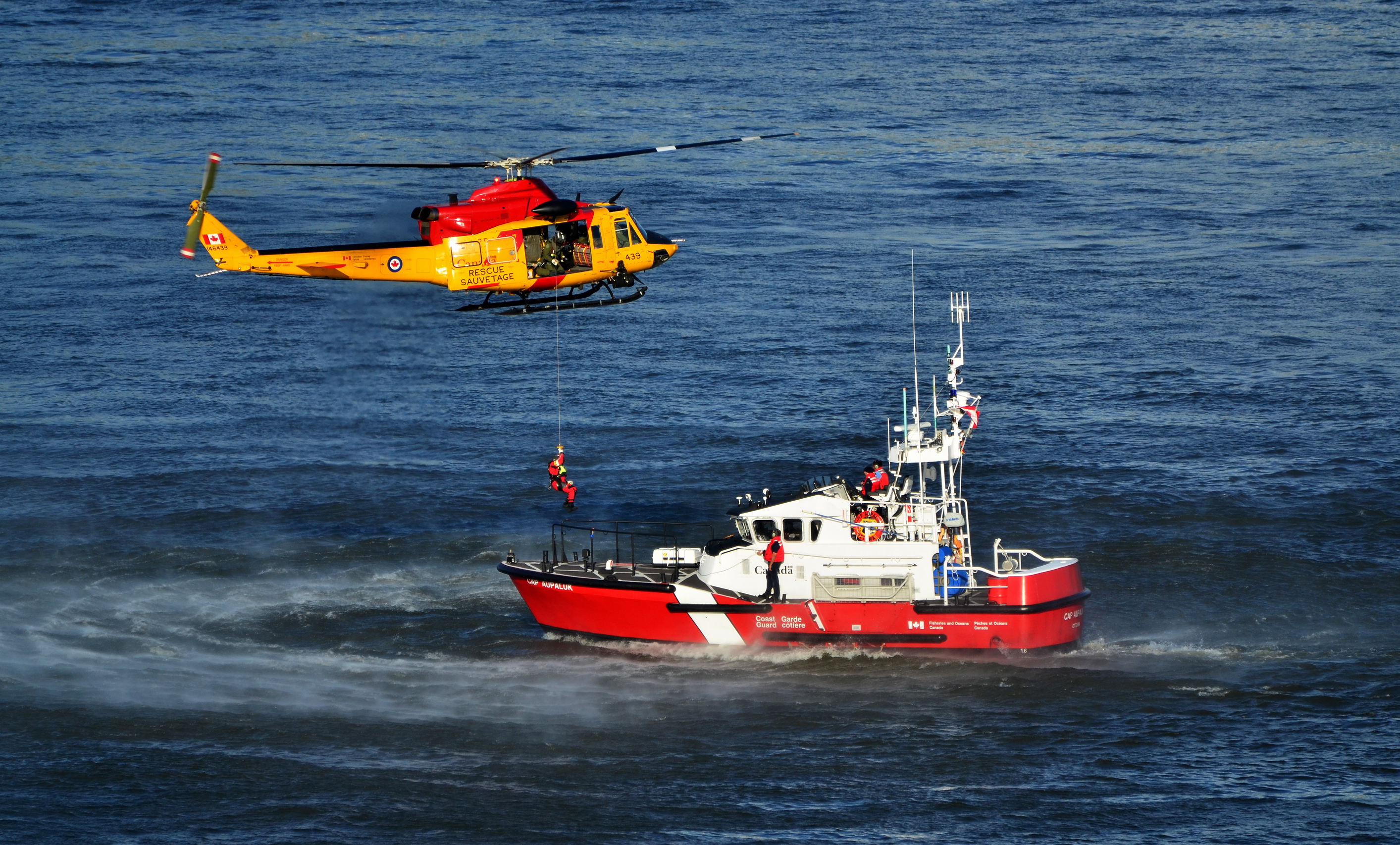
Rescue exercise by the Royal Canadian Air Force helicopter and CCGS Cap Aupaluk

=== Specialty vessel ===
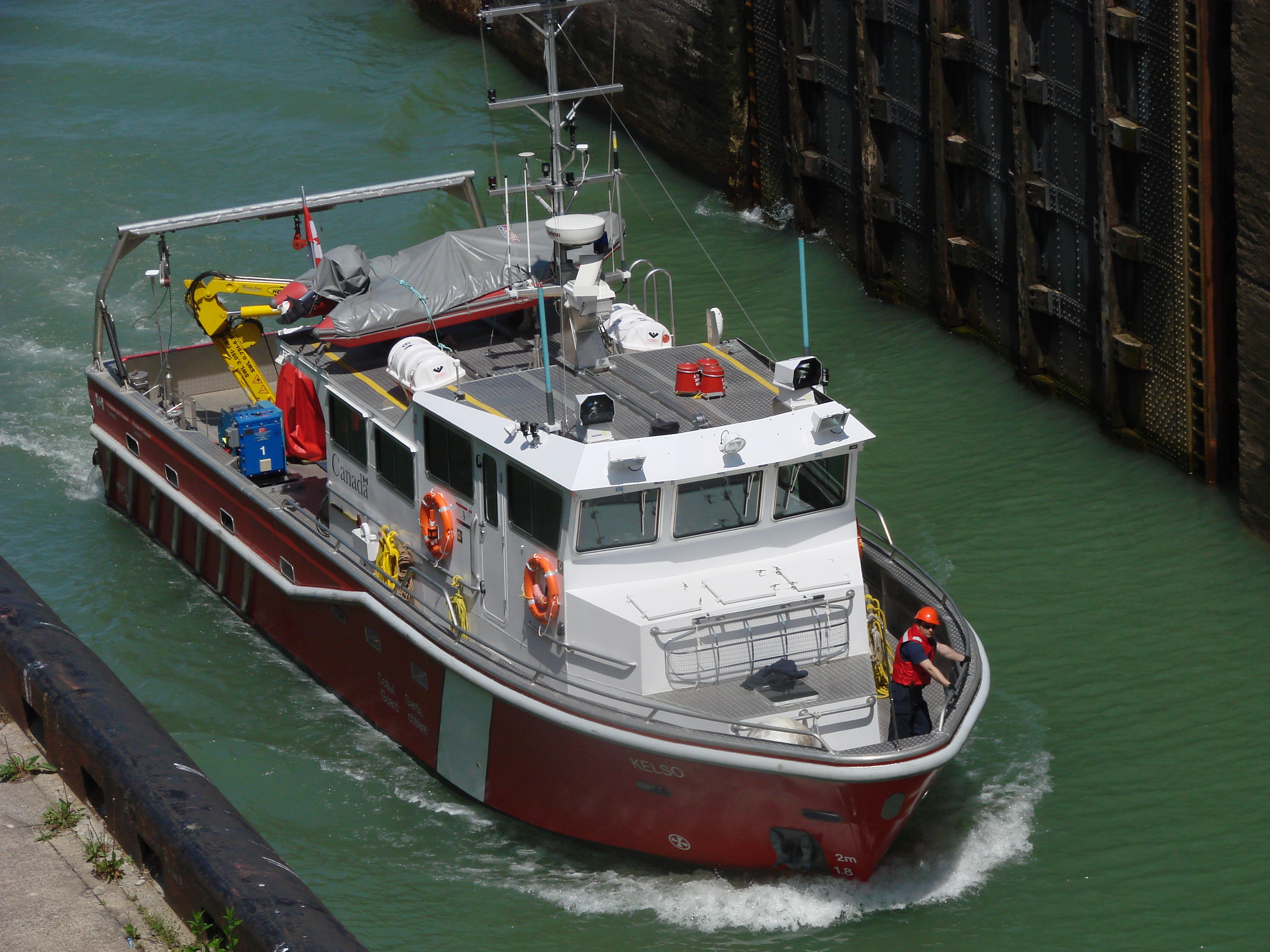
CCGS Kelso

Small, under 150 GT, shallow-draft vessel of various designs with no ice capability. Generally has no accommodation with a crew complement that is specific to tasks the vessel performs. No helicopter capability. Used for marine and fishery research, conservation and protection patrols, science and aids to navigation. Named after Former Canadians who have made a contribution to marine and fishery research or fisheries management or maritime safety or security or marine transportation.

- CCGS Cape Light
- CCGS Caribou Isle - small buoy tender
- CCGS Cove Isle - small buoy tender
- CCGS Geliget
- CCGS Île Saint Ours - small buoy tender
- CCGS Kelso
- CCGS Kode & Kin
- CCGS Pointe Caveau
- CCGS S. Dudka
- CCGS Sigma T
- CCGS Traverse - river buoy tender
- CCGS Vakta
- CCGS Viola M. Davidson
- CCGS Partridge Island

=== Training vessels ===
Vessels used for training at the Coast Guard College.

- CCGS Goeland (retired)

=== Small/utility craft ===
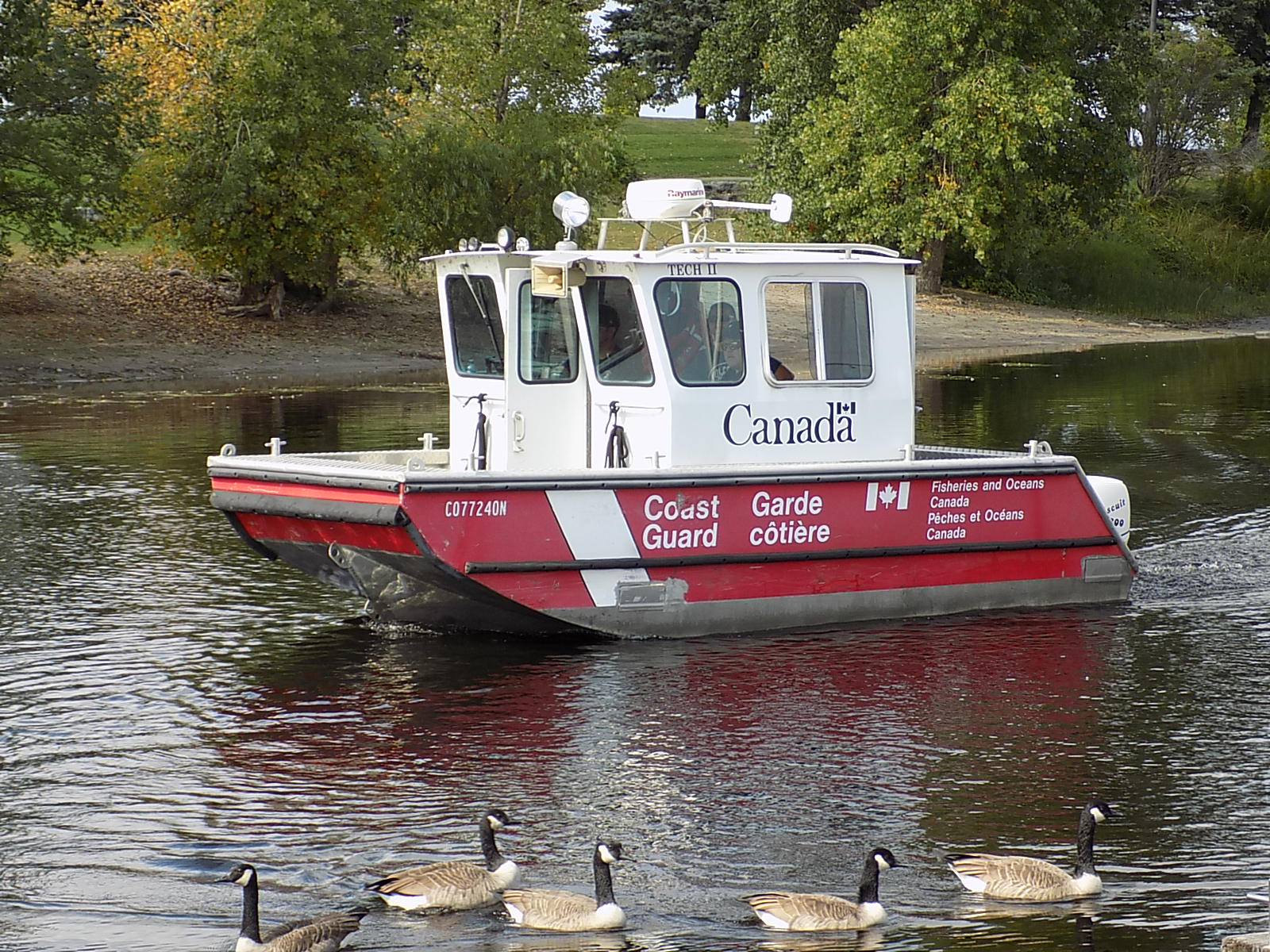
A Canadian Coast Guard trailerable buoy tender, named Tech II, at Nepean Sailing Club on Lac Deschênes.

CCG employs various makes and models of small craft, generally less than 15 GT, 12 metres (39 ft) long or less, aboard ships and at shore stations for utility and search and rescue tasks. Large vessels carry work boats such as Rotork Marine's Sea Truck design, similar to small landing craft, which are deployed by davits and used for delivering supplies ashore to light stations and remote communities. Rigid-hulled inflatable boats equipped with outboard or inboard engine propulsion systems are deployed aboard CCG ships or at shore stations as tenders and as fast rescue craft (FRC) for utility and search and rescue tasks. These vessels are not named.

- Work boats
  - Rosborough Boats RF-246 designs
  - Rotork Marine Sea Truck designs
- Rigid hull inflatable boats (RHIBs)
  - Zodiac Hurricane Mark IV, Mark V, Mark VI, 733 and 753 SOLAS designs
  - Rosborough Boats Rough Water 9.11 SOLAS designs
  - There are also two new 40-foot (12 m) high-speed, aluminum Kingston-class search and rescue and environmental patrol boats built by Metalcraft Marine going into Arctic service.

== Retired vessels ==
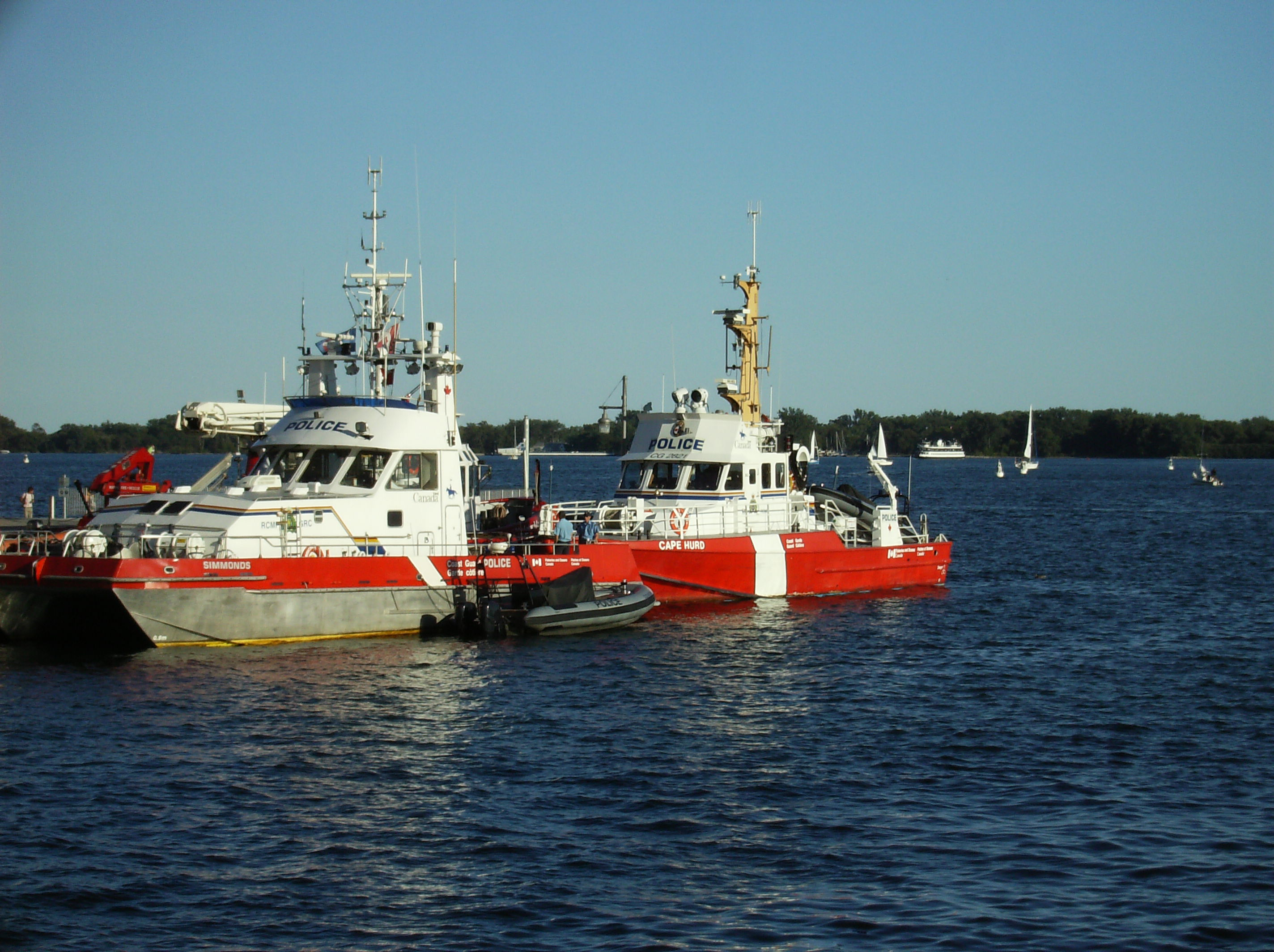
RCMP Simmonds with CCG Cape Hurd in Toronto

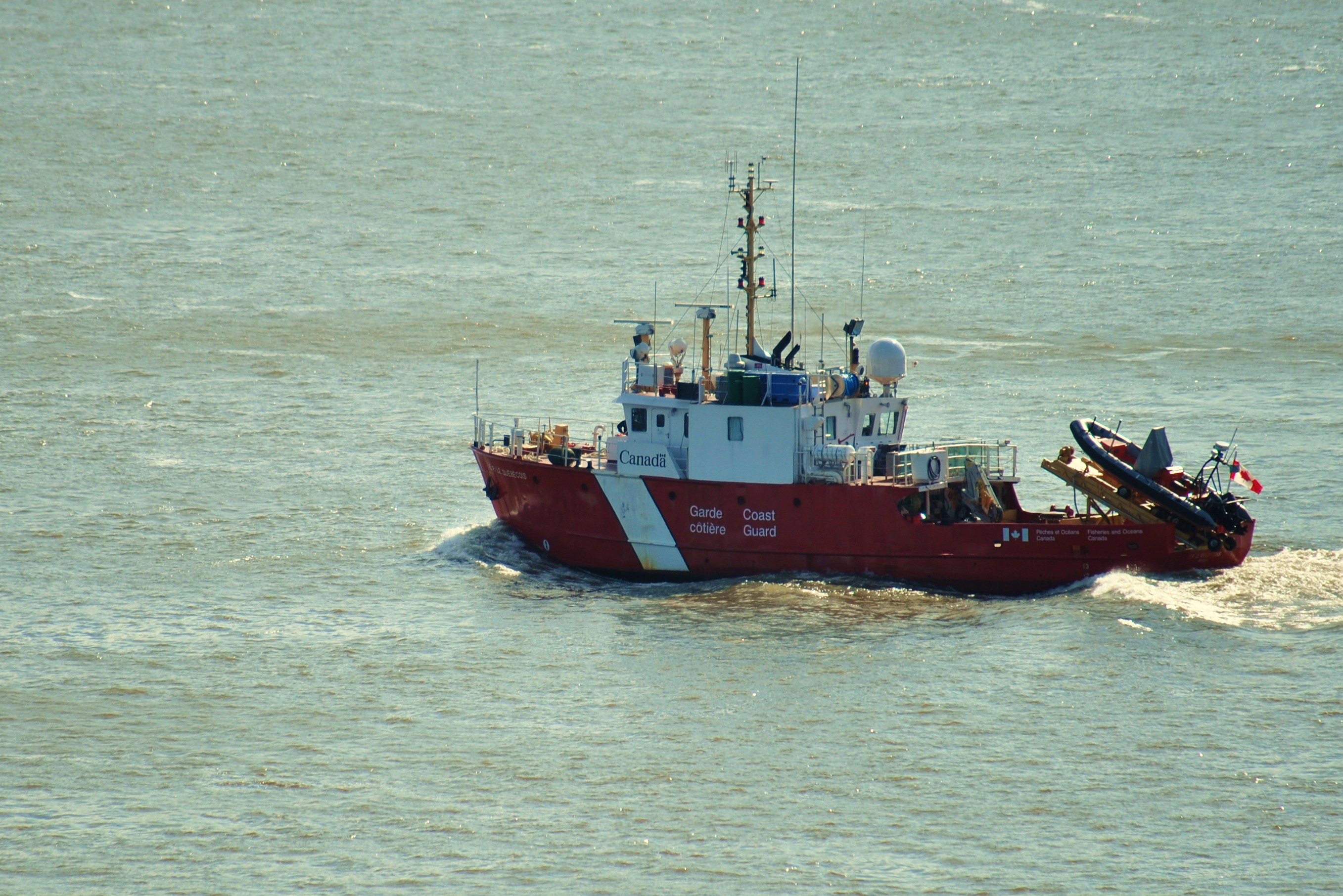
CCGS E.P. Le Québécois in the St. Lawrence River between Quebec City and Lévis

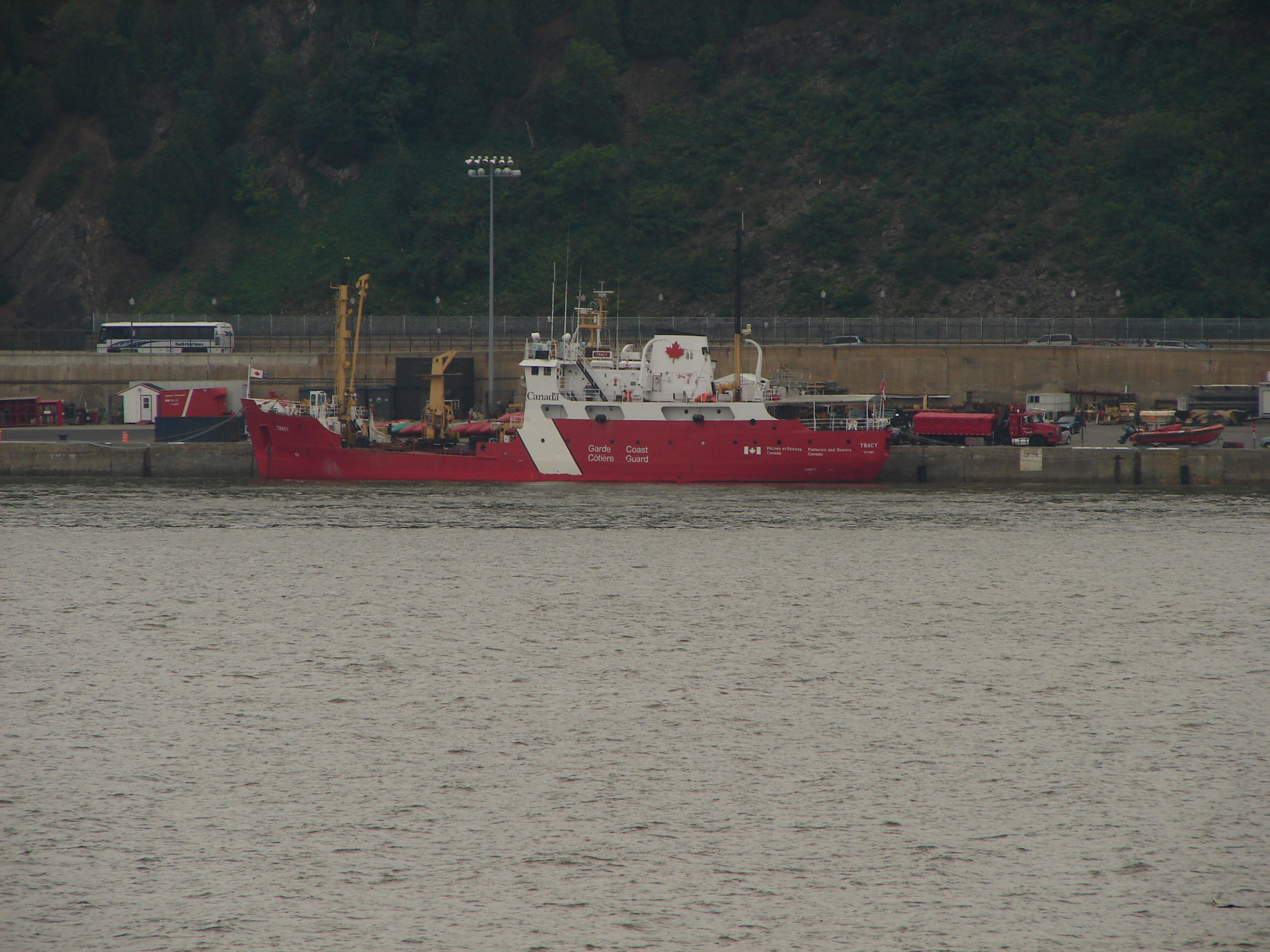
CCGS Tracy

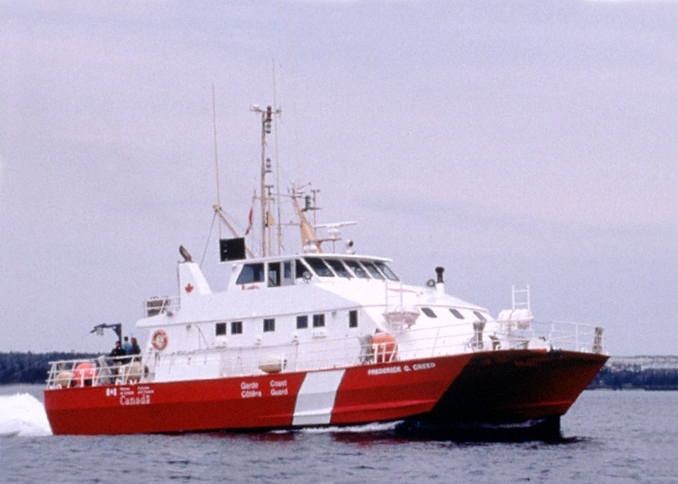
CCGS Frederick G. Creed - scrapped in 2020

The following is a listing of vessels that are no longer part of the Canadian Coast Guard's present fleet.

- CCGS A.H. Chevarie
- CCGS Advent
- CCGS Alert
- CCGS Alexander Henry
- CCGS Alfred Needler
- CCGS Arrow Post – July 2016 – transferred to Parks Canada – now named RV David Thompson
- CCGS Bartlett
- CCGS C.D. Howe
- CCGS CG 117 – retired
- CCGS CG 118 – retired
- CCGS CG 119
- CCGS CG 214 - previously known as Polar Gas II - believed to have been sold at auction
- CCGS Calanus II – decommissioned
- CCGS Camsell - Icebreaker, lighthouse supply and buoy vessel decommissioned 1985, scrapped 1989
- CCGS Cape Hurd – now retired and re-commissioned by Toronto Fire Services as fireboat William Thornton in 2015
- CCGS Corporal McLaren M.M.V.
- CCGS Cumella
- CCGS D'Iberville
- CCGS E.P. Le Québécois - decommissioned 2012
- CCGS Ernest Lapointe - decommissioned 1978 and museum ship since 1980
- CCGS Frederick G. Creed - scrapped in 2020
- CCGS G & D Mallard
- CCGS Gull Isle
- CCGS Harp
- CCGS Hood
- CCGS Hudson
- CCGS Île des Barques
- CCGS Isle Rouge
- CCGS J.E. Bernier
- CCGS John A. Macdonald
- CCGS John Cabot (1965) - ice breaker/cable ship; assisted in the rescue of Roger Mallinson and Roger Chapman. Sold in 1994
- CCGS John Jacobson
- CCGS Kitimat II
- CCGS Labrador
- CCGS Louis M.Lauzier - sold and now MV Leeway Odyssey
- CCGS Louisbourg
- CCGS Mary Hichens - delivered in 1983 for SFO and retired 2000; built as Beau Bois
- CCGS Matthew
- CCGS Mikula - ex-Lurcher No.5 lightship, training ship at the Canadian Coast Guard College in the 1970s
- CCGS Miskanaw
- CCGS Montmagny
- CCGS Nahidik
- CCGS Narwhal
- CCGS N.B. McLean
- CCGS Norman McLeod Rogers
- CCGS Opilio
- CCGS Pandalus III
- CCGS Parizeau - decommissioned 2001; scrapped 2011
- CCGS Partridge Island
- CCGS Penac
- CSS Pender (1) - The first barge with this name from 1930 to 1950
- CCGS Pender (2) - The second barge with this name from 1975 to 2009
- CCGS Point Race
- CCGS Point Henry
- CCGS Porte Dauphine
- CCGS Provo Wallis
- CCGS R.B. Young
- CCGS Racer
- CCGS Rally
- CCGS Rapid
- CCGS Relay
- CCGS Rider
- CCGS Revisor
- CCGS Robert Foulis
- CCGS Shamook
- CCGS Shark
- CCGS Simcoe
- CCGS Simmonds
- CCGS Simon Fraser
- CCGS Sir Humphrey Gilbert
- CCGS Skua
- CCGS Sooke Post
- CCGS Sora - retired 2005 and re-commissioned by Toronto Fire as fireboat Sora; retired in 2015
- CCGS Spray
- CCGS Spume
- CCGS Spindrift
- CCGS Spilsbury
- CCGS Sterne
- CCGS Tembah
- CCGS Thomas Carleton
- CCGS Tracy
- CCGS Tsekoa II
- CCGS Tuebor
- CCGS Tupper
- CCGS Ville Marie - survey ship sold and renamed Heavenbound 1984; renamed again as Still Watch 1995
- CCGS Waban-Aki
- CCGS W.E. Ricker
- CCGS Wilfred Templeman
- CSS William J. Stewart - hydrographic survey ship from 1932 to 1975
- CCGS 6C-4828
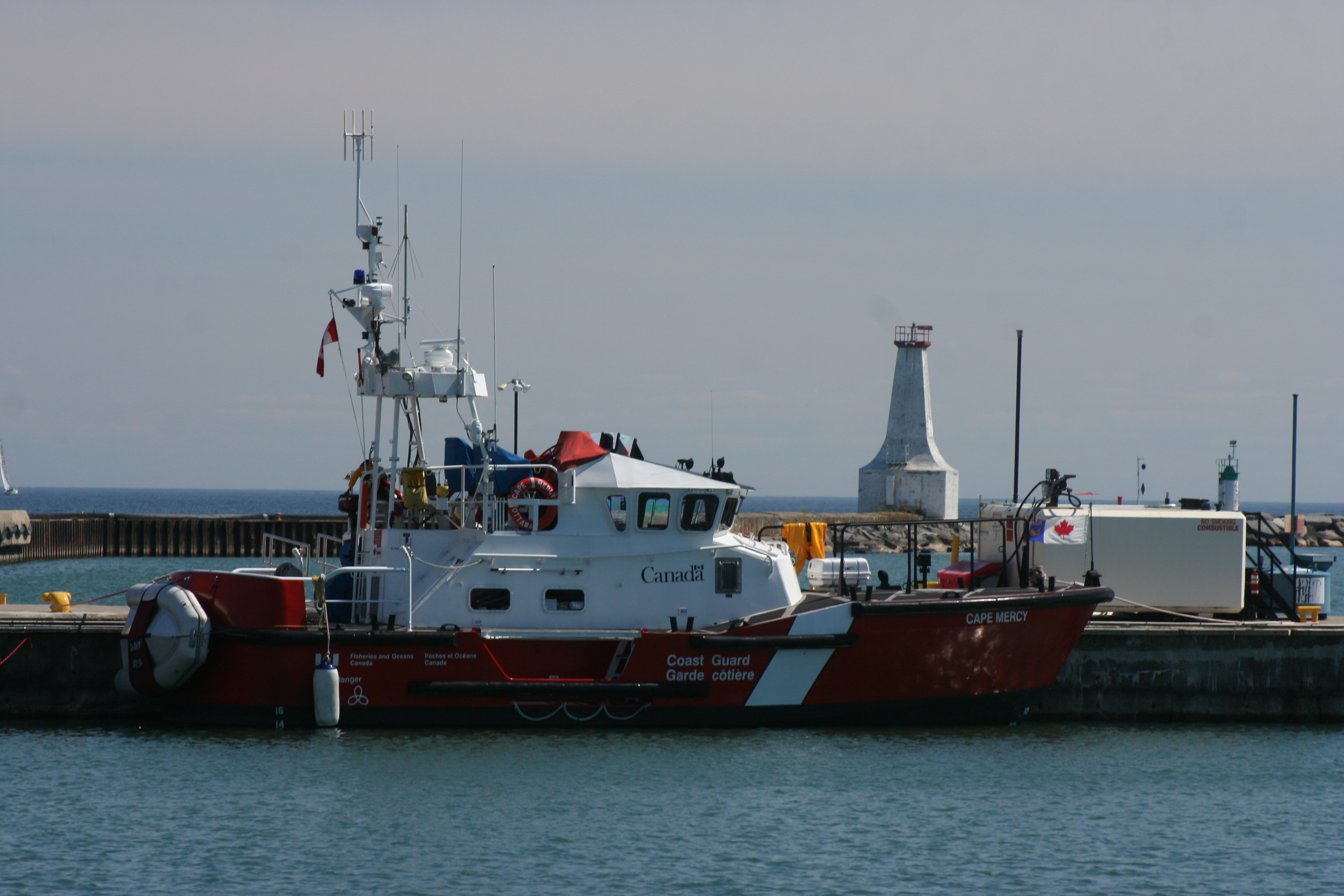
CCGS Cape Mercy

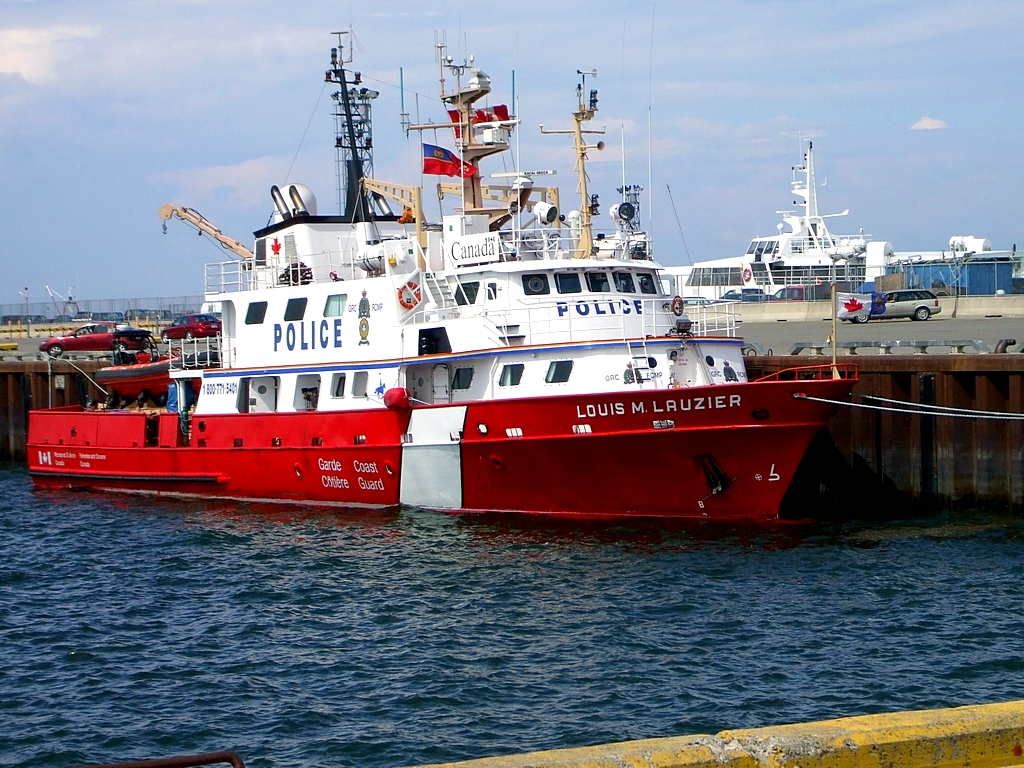
The former CCGS Louis M. Lauzier in service 2012; now sold to LeeWay Marine and operated as MV LeeWay Odyssey

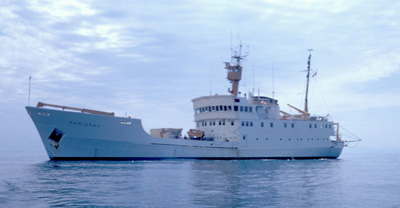
ex-CCGS Parizeau sold and renamed Destiny Empress

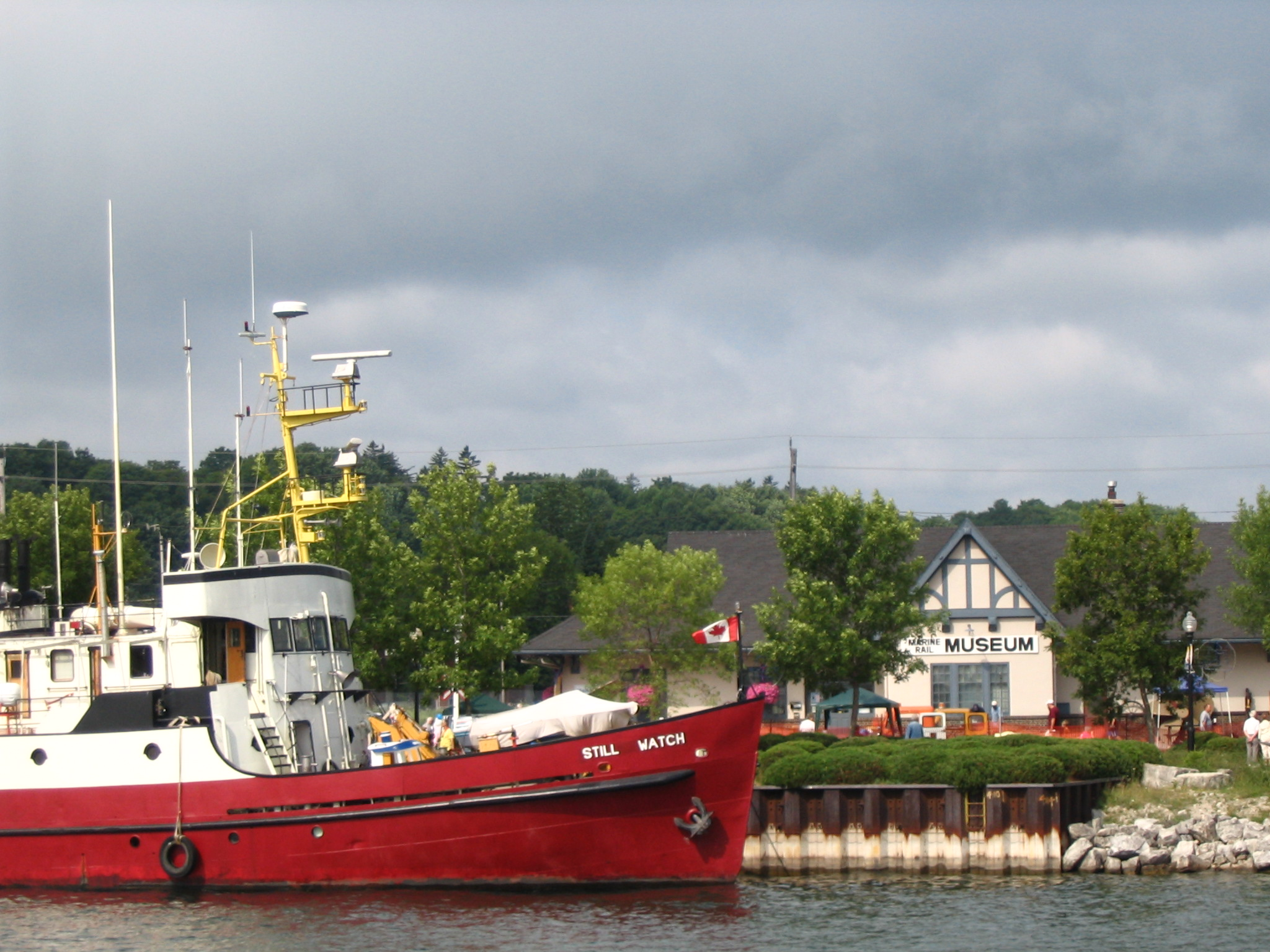
ex-CCGS Ville Marie

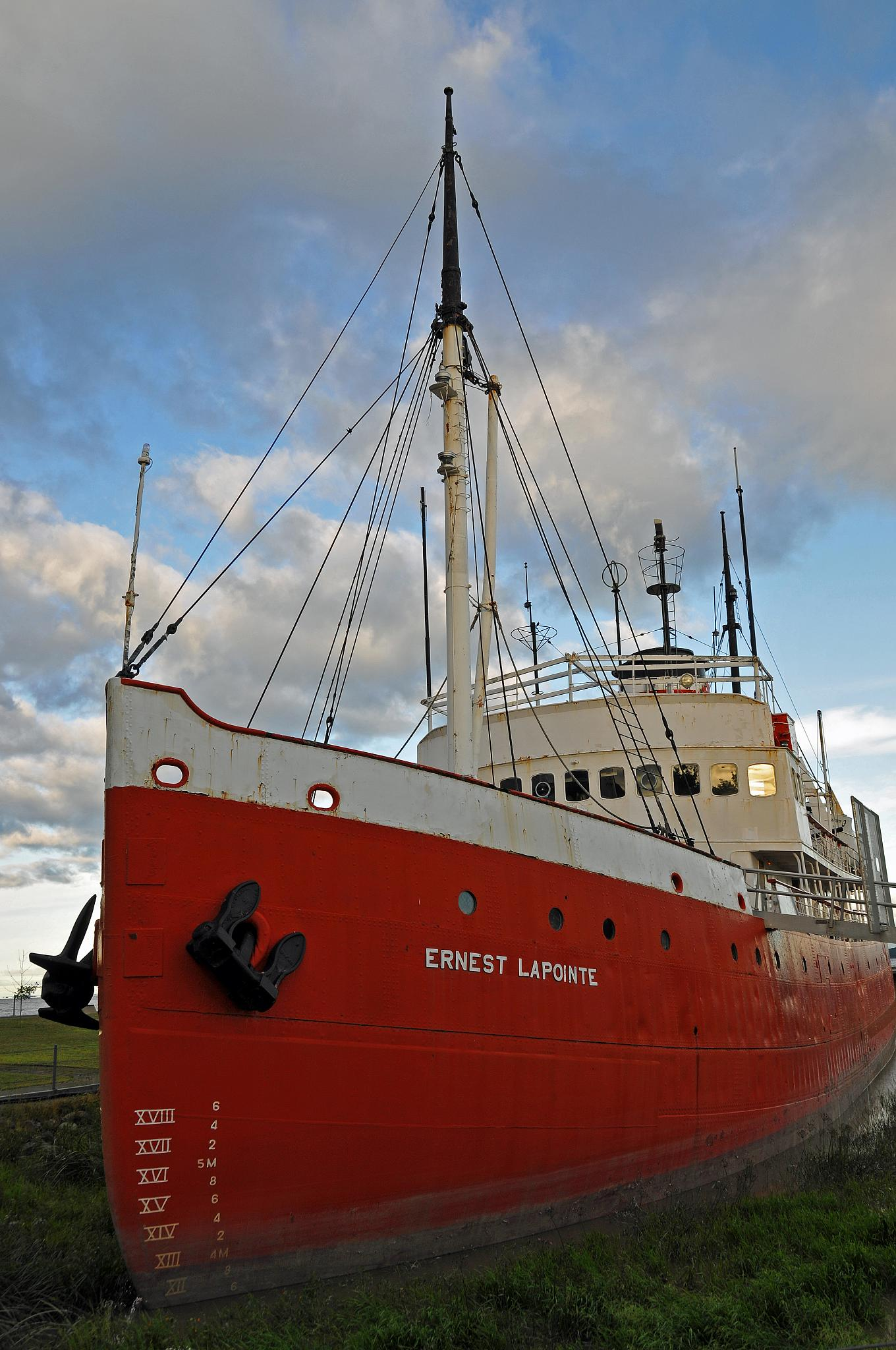
ex-CCGS Ernest Lapointe icebreaker

Aft View of CCGS McIntyre Bay transiting Porpoise Harbour on a misty day, near Port Edward, British Columbia

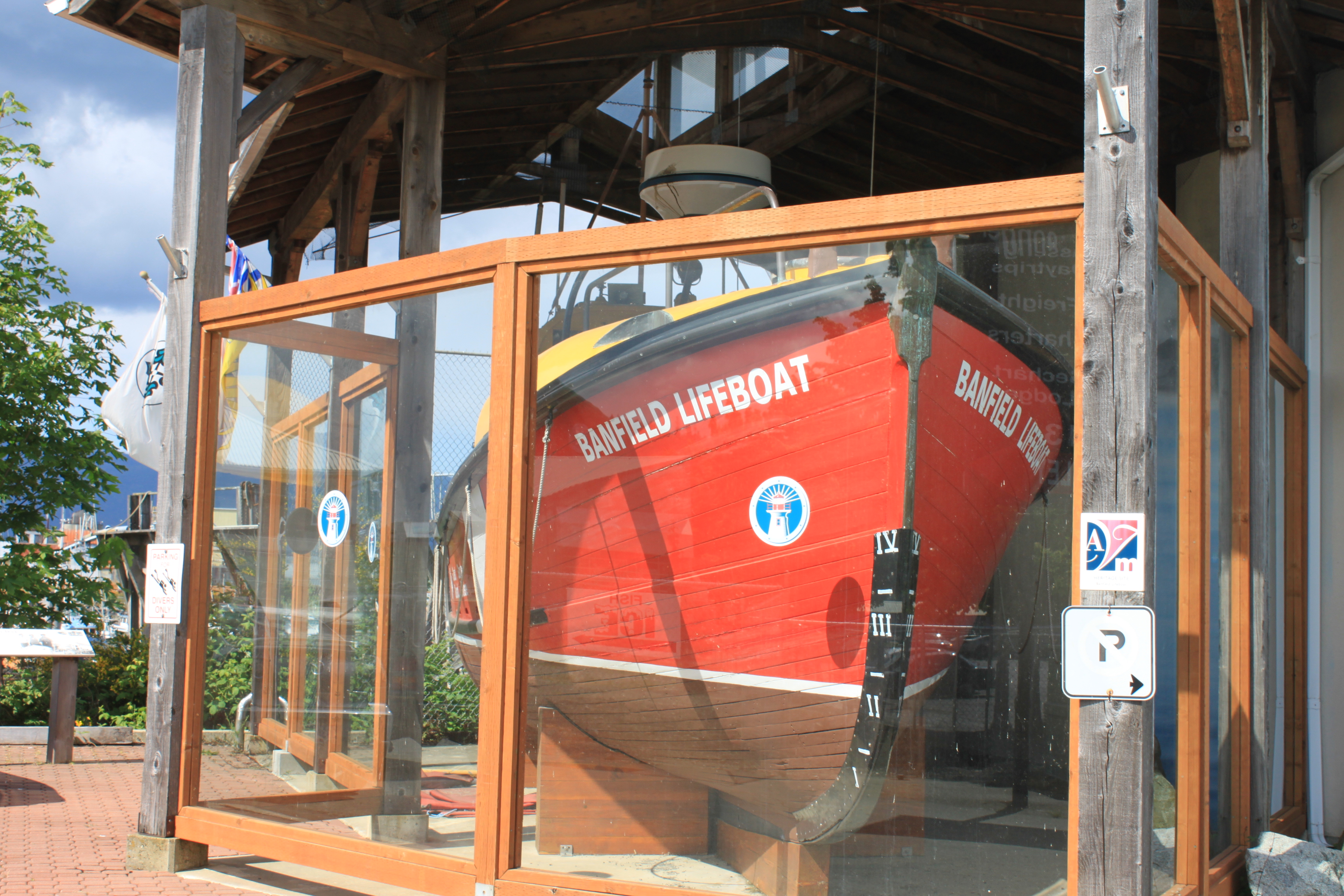
Banfield Lifeboat

== Aircraft ==
In addition to various bases located in deep water ports, rescue stations in smaller minor ports, and eighteen ships equipped with aviation facilities such as flight decks and/or hangars, the CCG operates 23 helicopters and eight fixed wing aircraft. Rotary wing aircraft are used as ice reconnaissance platforms in the winter (operating from icebreakers and shore bases), while flying maintenance personnel and supplies for servicing aids to navigation year-round. Fixed wing aircraft are flown in support of the Canadian Ice Service and also conduct arctic sovereignty patrols, marine pollution surveillance and fisheries protection patrols as part of the Canadian government's National Aerial Surveillance Program.

As part of the Coast Guard's Fleet Renewal Plan, the Government of Canada has purchased and deployed twenty-three new helicopters: sixteen light-lift helicopters (Bell 429) and seven medium-lift helicopters (Bell 412EPI).

In December 2013, the Minister of National Defence (the lead Minister for Search and Rescue) released the first "Quadrennial SAR Review" in order to provide a comprehensive perspective of Canada's National SAR Program (NSP). In the SAR resources section of the review it states "The Canadian Coast Guard has a total of 117 vessels and 22 helicopters stationed across the country that can deliver maritime SAR services, either in a primary or secondary role".

=== Rotary-wing deployment ===
==== Atlantic Region ====
- Seven Bell 429s are operated in: Stephenville, Newfoundland and Labrador (1), St. John's, Newfoundland and Labrador (2), Charlottetown, Prince Edward Island (1), Halifax, Nova Scotia (2) and Saint John, New Brunswick (1).
- Three Bell 412s are operated in Halifax (2) and St John's, Newfoundland (1).

==== Central/Arctic Region ====
- Four Bell 429s operate in Quebec City, Quebec; one operates in Parry Sound, Ontario
- Two Bell 412s are operated in Quebec City (1) and Parry Sound (1).

==== Western Region ====
- Four Bell 429s (three operated in Victoria, BC and one from Seal Cove Base in Prince Rupert, BC)
- Three Bell 412s (two operated from Seal Cove Base in Prince Rupert, BC and one in Victoria, BC)

The Bell 412s replaced the Bell 212s that operated until in 2017.

=== Fixed-wing deployment ===
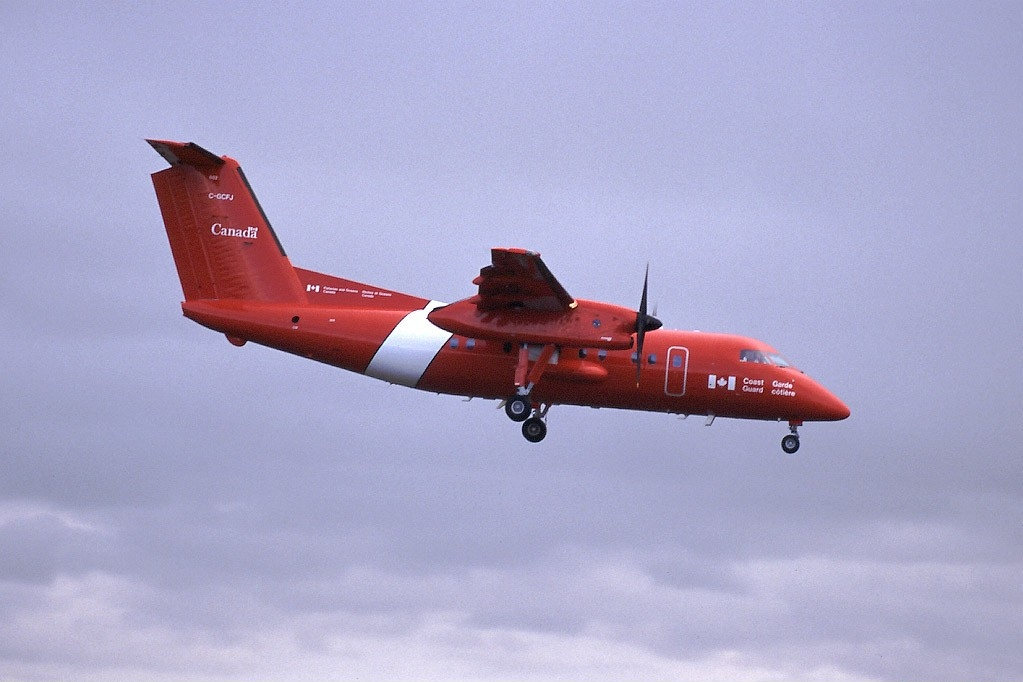
A Dash 8-100 (C-GCFJ) approaching Ottawa Airport.

Fixed wing aircraft were previously owned and operated by Transport Canada but were transferred to the Coast Guard in April 2026. The aircraft are used to support the National Aerial Surveillance Program, which monitors marine pollution and whale migrations.

Aircraft	Origin	Type	Variant	In service
Beechcraft King Air	United States	Maritime patrol	Beechcraft C90A	3
De Havilland Canada Dash 7	Canada	Maritime patrol	De Havilland Canada DHC-7-150	1
De Havilland Canada Dash 8	Canada	Maritime patrol	De Havilland Canada Dash 8-100	3
Elbit Hermes 900	Israel	Maritime patrol	Elbit Hermes 900 Starliner	1

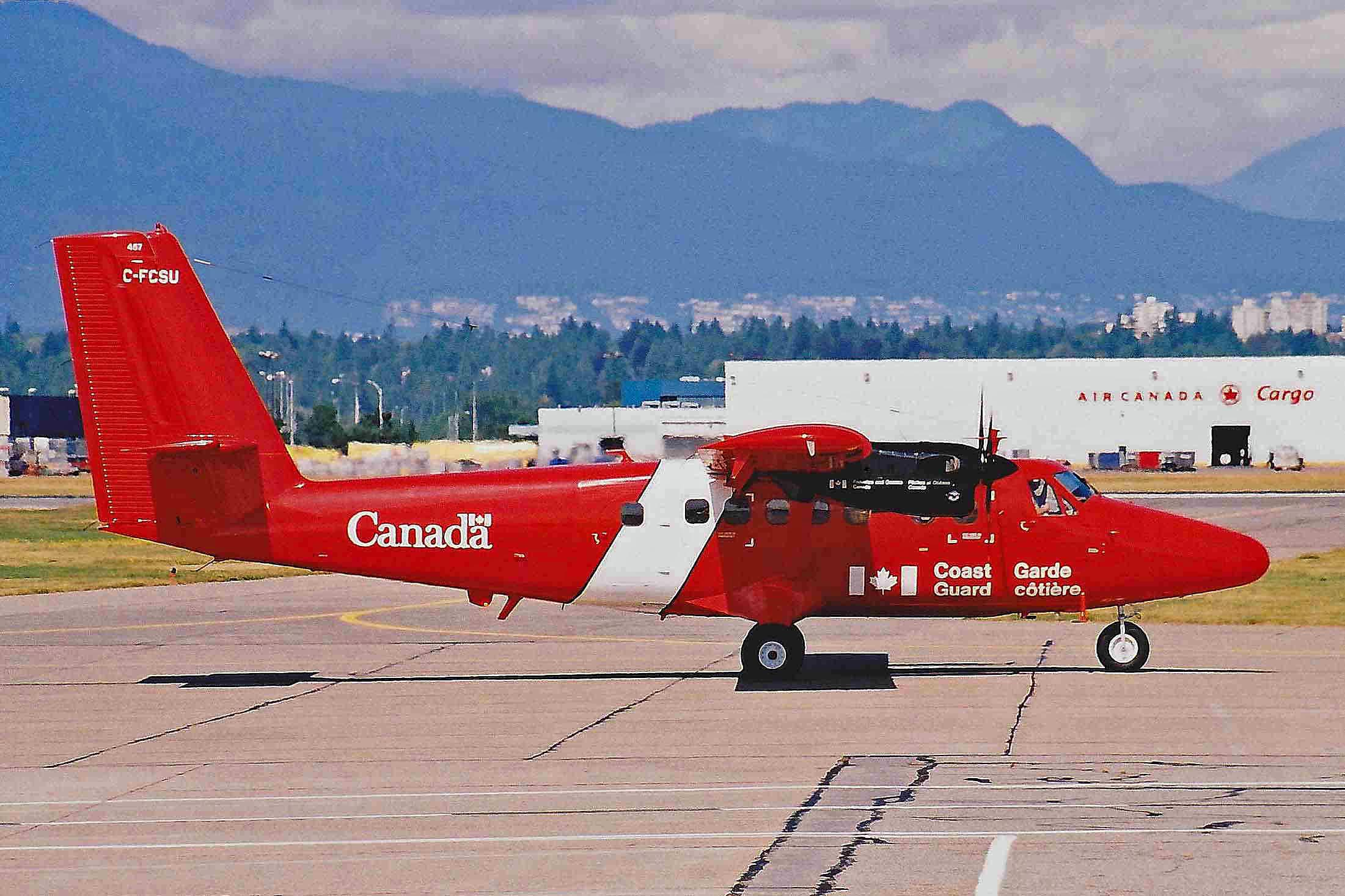
de Havilland Canada DHC-6 Twin Otter (C-FCSU) at Vancouver International Airport.

=== Bases ===
All CCG regions operate helicopters. However, ice reconnaissance missions are primarily flown in eastern Canada, given the absence of ice surveillance requirements for the West Coast. Unlike fixed-wing aircraft, helicopters can often operate directly out of CCG bases, as is the case in Quebec City and Parry Sound. The majority of CCG aircraft operate from municipal airports located near major CCG bases, as follows:

Fixed and rotary-wing maintenance

- Ottawa Macdonald–Cartier International Airport (YOW), Ottawa, Ontario

Fixed wing operations and maintenance

- Vancouver International Airport (YVR), Richmond, British Columbia
- Greater Moncton International Airport (YQM), Dieppe, New Brunswick
- Iqaluit Airport (YFB), Iqaluit, Nunavut
- Halifax Stanfield International Airport (YHZ), Halifax
- St. John's International Airport (YYT), St. John's

Rotary-wing operations and maintenance

- Stephenville International Airport (YJT), Stephenville, Newfoundland and Labrador
- St. John's International Airport (YYT), St. John's, Newfoundland and Labrador
- 12 Wing Shearwater (YAW), Halifax, Nova Scotia
- Saint John Airport (YSJ), Saint John, New Brunswick
- Charlottetown Airport (YYG), Charlottetown, Prince Edward Island
- Canadian Coast Guard Base Parry Sound, Parry Sound, Ontario
- Victoria International Airport (YYJ) and Shoal Point, Sidney, British Columbia
- Prince Rupert Airport (YPR) and CCG Base Seal Cove, Prince Rupert, British Columbia

CCG's fixed-wing operations and maintenance bases are co-located with Transport Canada aviation operations facilities. Maintenance for all CCG aircraft is provided by both CCG and Transport Canada personnel.

=== Air search and rescue ===
All Canadian Coast Guard aircraft are able assist the Canadian Forces with search and rescue operations, as well as having a secondary air search and rescue role in the CCG.

Aircraft	Origin	Type	Versions	In service	Notes
Bell 412 EPI	Canada	rotary wing		7	7 aircraft acquired to replace the Bell 212, final model delivered March 24, 2017.
Bell 429 CCG	Canada	rotary wing		16	16 in service, delivered in 2015, 2016, and 2021 replacing MBB Bo 105.
de Havilland Canada Dash 8	Canada	fixed wing		3	Canadian Ice Service ice reconnaissance, oil pollution surveillance and marine wildlife monitoring. 2x DHC-8M-102 (C-GSUR & C-GCFJ) 1x DHC-8M-103 (C-FTFM).
Beech Super King Air B200	US	fixed wing		4	Contracted by the Canadian government and owned and operated by Provincial Aerospace Limited for ice reconnaissance, marine fisheries and marine pollution surveillance
de Havilland Canada Dash 7	Canada	fixed wing		1	Canadian Ice Service ice reconnaissance and oil pollution surveillance DHC-7-150ir (C-GCFR).

=== Canadian Coast Guard Auxiliary ===
The Canadian Coast Guard Auxiliary (CCGA) does not operate an aviation branch. This role is instead provided by the volunteer Civil Air Search and Rescue Association (CASARA). Some CCGA volunteers also volunteer with CASARA or have cross-trained with the Royal Canadian Air Force (RCAF).

== Retired aircraft ==
CCG has operated the following aircraft types which have since been retired:

- Bell 47
- Bell 206 JetRanger A/B and LongRanger L variants
- Bell 212 Twin Two Twelve
- Douglas C-47 Skytrain - operated by Transport Canada
- Cessna Super Skymaster
- Grumman S-2 Tracker
- Aérospatiale Alouette III
- Sikorsky S-61
- MBB Bo 105S

== Procurement ==
Many larger vessels in the CCG are close to the end of their planned lifetime, having been constructed from the 1960s–1980s with no replacements in the 1990s–2000s. To replace them, new icebreakers, multi-purpose vessels, patrol ships and science vessels are to be constructed under terms of the National Shipbuilding Procurement Strategy; now known as the National Shipbuilding Strategy (NSS). Under the NSS and since Budget 2006, the following projects have been initiated:

=== Mid Shore Patrol Vessel Project ===
The Mid Shore Patrol Vessel Project procured nine vessels to supplement fisheries conservation and protection duties as well as marine security duties in the Maritime, Newfoundland, Pacific, and Central and Arctic regions. It was expected that four of these vessels are to be tasked with marine security duties in Central and Arctic Region and will have an operating area in the Great Lakes – St. Lawrence Seaway. The initial procurement process for 12 ships was cancelled in 2008 when bids came in over budget; however, a revised bidding process was reissued in 2009. On September 2, 2009, Public Works and Government Services Canada awarded a contract to Halifax Shipyards to build nine (down from the original twelve) mid-shore patrol vessels based on a 'Canadianized' version of the Damen Stan 4207 patrol vessel. All vessels had been delivered to the Coast Guard by the end of 2014.

=== Offshore Fisheries Science Vessel Project ===
The federal government announced the Offshore Fisheries Science Vessel Project in 2006 to procure vessels that are 67 metres (220 ft) in length and be capable of carrying 22 to 26 crew as well as 19 scientists. Two vessels were provided for in Budget 2006, with funding for an additional vessel added in Budget 2007. The procurement process for these vessels began in September 2009, and actual construction work on the three vessels in the class started in June 2015 at Seaspan ULC's Vancouver Shipyards. They were originally projected to start entering service in 2017. However, the first vessel of the class, CCGS Sir John Franklin, was delivered in June 2019 followed by the second ship, CCGS Capt. Jacques Cartier, in December 2019. In October 2020, the third and final ship of the class, CCGS John Cabot, was handed over to the Coast Guard completing the project. She will be home ported in St. John's, Newfoundland.

=== Offshore Oceanographic Science Vessel Project ===
The Offshore Oceanographic Science Vessel Project was a plan to procure a single vessel that is 90–100 metres (300–330 ft) in length capable of carrying 30 crew as well as 37 scientists. The ship replaces CCGS Hudson which was Canada's major oceanographic research vessel for 40 years but suffered a "catastrophic motor failure" in 2021 ending her service. Funds for the project were initially allocated in Budget 2007. The first phase of the procurement process for this vessel, along with the three offshore fisheries science vessels, was launched in September 2009 when the government issued a Solicitation of Interest and Qualification to identify qualified designers. Although construction was originally scheduled to proceed immediately following the Offshore Fisheries Science Vessel project, construction of this vessel is now taking place between the construction of the two Protecteur-class joint support ships at the Seaspan Yard. In February 2021, a $453.8 million contract was awarded to Seaspan yards to begin construction on the vessel. The full costs, however, were reported to be nearly $1 billion, a figure attracting considerable criticism. In late 2023, it was reported that the cost had increased by a further $280 million. The first steel was cut on the new ship in March 2021 with an envisaged completion date of 2024. However, that projected in-service date subsequently slipped to 2025. In November 2022, it was reported that the ship's keel had been formally laid down. The vessel was named CCGS Naalak Nappaaluk and she was launched in August 2024. began her sea trials in June 2025 and entered service at the end of the year.

=== Polar Class Icebreaker Project ===
The February 2008 federal budget designated $720 million for the Polar Class Icebreaker Project to replace CCGS Louis S. St-Laurent in FY 2017. In August 2008 the name for this project's sole vessel was announced as CCGS John G. Diefenbaker. This vessel was originally scheduled to start construction at the Seaspan ULC yard in Vancouver in sequence after two new Protecteur-class joint support ships (JSS) were built for the Royal Canadian Navy. However, ongoing delays with the JSS and other projects resulted in the reallocation of this vessel to another yard in 2019 with an uncertain build timeframe. In February 2020, the federal government requested that all interested Canadian shipyards to outline their capacity to potentially construct the polar icebreaker with the objective of securing service entry by December 2029. In May 2021, the Government announced that two polar icebreakers — CCGS Arpatuuq and CCGS Imnaryuaq — would be built instead, one at Seaspan and the other at Davie (pending the successful conclusion of the umbrella agreement with Davie which was concluded in April 2023). The service entry for the first of these two icebreakers was then projected as being in 2030. In 2021, the Parliamentary Budget Officer estimated the lifetime cost of building two vessels at $7.25 billion. By 2024, that estimate had increased to $8.5 billion. The construction of the first vessel began at Seaspan on 3 April 2025. As of March 2025, the combined value of the contracts awarded to Davie and Seaspan is $7.53 billion.

=== Inshore Fisheries Science Vessel Project ===
The 2009 federal budget announced $175 million in funding for, among other things an Inshore Fisheries Science Vessel Project which will procure three new Inshore Fisheries Science Vessels. Two 22-metre (72 ft) vessels are to be based in Quebec region, while a third 25-metre (82 ft) vessel will be based in Maritime region (in New Brunswick). In June 2009, the government awarded a contract to Robert Allan Ltd. of Vancouver, British Columbia to design the vessels. The vessels are CCGS Vladykov, CCGS M. Perley and CCGS Leim. In June 2012, the first vessel, CCGS Vladykov, which had been built at Meridien Maritime in Matane, Quebec, arrived at its homeport of St. John's, Newfoundland and Labrador. CCGS M. Perley and CCGS Leim also entered service in 2012. M. Perley is homeported at Dartmouth, Nova Scotia, while Leim is homeported at Sorel-Tracy, Quebec.

=== Medium icebreakers ===
In 2019, the federal government indicated that a third shipyard would be added to the National Shipbuilding Strategy and that the construction of six medium icebreakers, to replace the Coast Guard's existing and aging icebreaker fleet, would be undertaken. A competition was undertaken to select the third yard with the envisaged construction of the icebreakers to proceed starting in the 2020s. In December 2019, it was announced that only the Davie Shipyard had qualified to build the envisaged icebreakers for the CCG. An umbrella agreement was planned to be negotiated between Davie and the Government of Canada by the end of 2020. In May 2021 the Government announced that the envisaged umbrella agreement with Davie was now anticipated at the end of 2021, one year later than originally planned. As of the end of 2021, further progress on the conclusion of the umbrella agreement had not yet been reported. In June 2022 the Government again indicated that negotiations had been initiated to conclude an agreement by the end of the year. The agreement to incorporate Davie as a third shipyard within the NSS was finally signed in April 2023 permitting negotiations for the future construction of the icebreakers to begin. In March 2024, Davie was awarded its first contract for the design of the new vessels. A contract to build the six vessels was awarded in August 2026. Construction was projected to begin in 2027 with the first vessel scheduled for service entry in 2032.

=== Multi-purpose icebreakers ===
Up to 16 Multi Purpose Vessels (subsequently re-classed as "Multi Purpose Icebreakers" - MPI) are now scheduled to be built at the Seaspan yard after the second of the two joint support ships are completed. This project is a new addition to the National Shipbuilding Strategy which is designed to provide greater stability to the build program at Seaspan. The MTIs will supersede originally envisaged Offshore Patrol Vessels and Multi-Role High-Endurance Vessels (with a similar role) that originally had been planned to be built in two blocks of up to five ships each. Instead up to 16 new vessels (numbers being partially budget dependent) will be built which are envisaged as performing multiple roles for the Coast Guard by replacing several existing Coast Guard fleets. Construction work on this project is scheduled to begin at the Seaspan yard in the mid-2020s as work on the second of the two joint support ships winds down. In February 2024, a pre-construction design contract was awarded to Vancouver Shipyard for the project. Delivery of the first vessel was anticipated in 2030. The Functional Design Review for the first flight of six ships was said to have been completed in the summer of 2025. The ships are to displace more than 8,500 tonnes, be 100 metres in length and be able to accommodate up to 50 personnel. As Polar Class 4 icebreakers, they are to be able to break 1-metre (3.3 ft) ice continuously.

=== Arctic Offshore Patrol Ships ===
Two Arctic Offshore Patrol Ships (AOPS) are planned for the Coast Guard utilizing the same design as the vessels currently being constructed for the Royal Canadian Navy (RCN). As of 2020, construction of these Coast Guard variants of the AOPS design was scheduled to begin at the Irving Yard in Halifax in 2022 and 2023, coming at the tail end of AOPS production for the RCN. In 2022 it was reported that the two vessels were expected to be delivered in 2026 and 2027 respectively and that the cost would be significantly greater than originally anticipated, totalling about $1.5 billion for two ships. In January 2023, it was announced that the vessels had been ordered and that work on them would begin in the course of 2023. In early 2023, it was also reported that the projected costs for the two Coast Guard ships had increased by an additional $100 million. Steel was cut on the first Coast Guard variant in August 2023, starting construction while the second ship began construction in June 2024.

=== Miscellaneous vessels and repair of existing vessels ===
The funding announced in Budget 2009 also provided for the procurement of 98 small boats and barges for the CCG, as well as the life extension or repair of 40 of its larger vessels.

=== Light and medium-lift helicopters ===
On August 20, 2012, the Government of Canada announced a procurement of 24 new helicopters to replace the existing fleet with delivery in 2017. Of these helicopters, two could eventually be assigned to the new Polar-class icebreakers if and when those vessels enter service. The Canadian Government announced it will buy 15 Bell 429 helicopters to satisfy the requirement for light helicopters. The contracts for both the light helicopters and the medium-lift helicopters were signed in 2014–2015, with the seven Bell 412 EPI ordered to fulfill the medium-lift helicopter role in April 2015. Deliveries of the Bell 429 began in March 2015 and all aircraft were delivered by March 2016. Delivery of the Bell 412 EPI was completed in March 2017.

=== Second-hand vessels ===
The CCG acquired the Romanian-built commercial tug icebreaker Mangystau-2 in November 2021 from New Brunswick-based Atlantic Towing. The ship traveled from the Caspian Sea in Turkmenistan to CCG Base Prescott where it was converted into a light icebreaker by 2022. The ship, renamed CCGS Judy LaMarsh, entered service in 2023.

== See also ==
- List of Canadian Coast Guard Bases and Stations
- List of Canadian Coast Guard MCTS Centres
- List of equipment of the United States Coast Guard
