= CCGS Cape Ann =

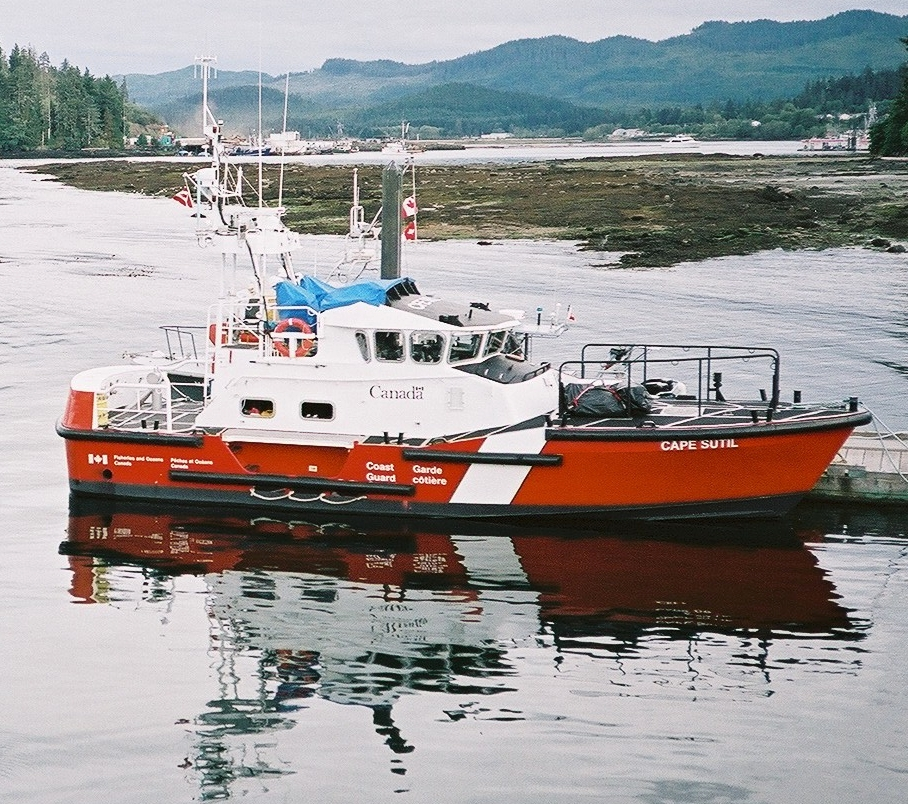
- Sister ship, CCGC Cape Sutil at CCG Station Port Hardy.

History

Canada
- Name: Cape Ann
- Operator: Canadian Coast Guard
- Port of registry: Ottawa, Ontario
- Builder: Victoria Shipyards, Victoria, British Columbia
- Yard number: 826525
- Launched: 2004
- Commissioned: 2005
- Home port: CCG Base Tofino, Victoria, British Columbia - Pacific Region
- Identification: MMSI number: 316005204; Callsign: CFG7741
- Status: in active service

General characteristics
- Class & type: Cape-class motor lifeboat
- Tonnage: 33.8 GT
- Length: 14.6 m (47 ft 11 in)
- Beam: 4.27 m (14 ft 0 in)
- Draft: 1.37 m (4 ft 6 in)
- Speed: 25 knots (46 km/h; 29 mph)
- Range: 200 nmi (370 km; 230 mi)
- Endurance: 1 day
- Complement: 4

CCGS Cape Ann is one of the Canadian Coast Guard's 36 Cape-class motor lifeboat. Cape Ann was built in the Victoria Shipyards, in Vancouver, and was dedicated at Victoria, British Columbia in June 2005 and is stationed at Tofino. Cape Ann was profiled in a segment on this class of motor lifeboats on the television show How things work.

== Design ==
Like all Cape-class motor lifeboats, Cape Ann has a displacement of 20 short tons (18 t), a total length of 47 feet 11 inches (14.61 m) and a beam of 14 feet (4.3 m). Constructed from marine-grade aluminium, it has a draught of 4 feet 6 inches (1.37 m). It contains two, computer-operated Caterpillar 3196 diesel engines, providing a combined 900 shaft horsepower (670 kW). It has two 28 by 36 inches (710 mm × 910 mm) four-blade propellers, and its complement is four crew members and five passengers.

The lifeboat has a maximum speed of 25 knots (46 km/h; 29 mph) and a cruising speed of 22 knots (41 km/h; 25 mph). Cape-class lifeboats have fuel capacities of 400 US gallons (1,500 L; 330 imp gal) and ranges of 200 nautical miles (370 km; 230 mi) when cruising. Cape Ann is capable of operating at wind speeds of 50 knots (93 km/h; 58 mph) and wave heights of 30 feet (9.1 m). It can tow ships with displacements of up to 150 tonnes (170 short tons) and can withstand 60-knot (110 km/h; 69 mph) winds and 20-foot (6.1 m)-high breaking waves.

Communication options include Raytheon 152 HF-SSB and Motorola Spectra 9000 VHF50W radios, and a Raytheon RAY 430 loudhailer system. The boat also supports the Simrad TD-L1550 VHF-FM radio direction finder. Raytheon provides a number of other electronic systems for the lifeboat, including the RAYCHART 620, the ST 30 heading indicator and ST 50 depth indicator, the NAV 398 global positioning system, a RAYPILOT 650 autopilot system, and either the R41X AN or SPS-69 radar systems.
