= Timeline of Port Dover, Ontario history =

This is a timeline of the history of Port Dover, Ontario, Canada.

== Timeline ==
=== Early history ===
- c. 11th century – c. 14th century – The Algonquin nation were the earliest-known occupants of the Port Dover area. They were noted flint-workers and evidence of their skill in crafting arrowheads is still to be found in open worked field areas surrounding the village.
- c. 14th century – c. 18th century – The Attawandaron nation, the Neutrals, occupied the region until they were absorbed into Iroquois. The last significant native nation to occupy the area was the Mississaugas.
- On March 13, 1670, Sulpician missionaries, René de Bréhant de Galinée and François Dollier de Casson claimed the northern shore of Lake Erie for France and erected a cross at the site (now Port Dover)
- 1794 – Mr. Peter Walker would become the first settler of this community; becoming its unofficial founder.
- May 14, 1814 – This community would become the subject of an American raid during the War of 1812.
- 1835 – Port Dover was incorporated as a village.
- 1850 – Several grain elevators were developed in Norfolk County; making the southern region of the country ripe for agriculture.
- 1862 – More than 100 vehicles were registered in the harbors of Port Dover; along with access from "nearby" Brantford for two lanes of horse and buggies.
- July 1, 1867 – Port Dover would become a part of the new Province of Ontario as the Government of Canada is formed through a system of confederation.
- 1880s – The railways are given financial incentive to expand to Port Dover; which was a village but not yet a town.

=== 20th Century ===
- 1904 – The Eliza Allan was sold; becoming the last schooner to be manufactured in Port Dover.
- 1914 – Port Dover Public School was built and was opened.
- August 1914 – Port Dover's bravest young men join the Royal Canadian Armed Forces to fight in World War I.
- April 11, 1915 – Former Canadian politician Eddie Sargent was born.
- December 1918 – Victorious Royal Canadian Armed Forces veterans come home from serving in World War I.
- 1920s through 1930s – Railway services to/from Port Dover officially commences with passenger, parcel, and freight services.
- August 6, 1939 – Port Dover's bravest veterans depart Canada for World War II in Europe.
- September 1945 – Victorious Royal Canadian Armed Forces veterans come home from World War II.
- November 3, 1945 – Haldimand-Norfolk's current MPP Toby Barrett was born.
- 1947 – The Lake Erie & Northern Railway would build another railway station on Chapman Street.
- October 27, 1957 – Passenger railroad service from the Caledonia Train Station to Port Dover was cancelled.
- 1962 – Port Dover Composite School was founded for students in grades 9 through 13 (now grades 7 through 12).
- 1969 through 1972 – Low gas prices in addition to low youth unemployment rates and a prosperous national economy allowed teenagers from the Simcoe area to socialize, dine and dance at Port Dover's attractions such as the ferris wheel, Guy Lombardo concerts at the Summer Garden and pickerel dinners at the Blue Pickerel.
- 1970s – Most businesses in Port Dover began adopting 6-day business weeks in their business operations; as opposed to closing on Wednesday afternoons and weekends.
- 1974 – The town was amalgamated into the new city of Nanticoke within the Regional Municipality of Haldimand-Norfolk.
- 1975 – The first mild winter for the Port Dover area since Canada became a Dominion on July 1, 1867 occurred. A series of mild winters would eventually start in the late 1990s and persist into the present day.
- November 1977 – Parcel and freight service to and from Port Dover Train Station was discontinued.
- June 1, 1980 – Unemployment levels drop throughout the summer of 1980 as Stelco Lake Erie Works in nearby Nanticoke manufactures its first steel products; thus opening up to manufacturers looking for "local" steel.
- February 13, 1981 – Port Dover's inaugural Friday the 13th motorcycle rally was held.
- April 1, 1983 – Major League Baseball pitcher John Axford is born.
- January 21, 1984 – Former Olympic athlete and women's softball athlete Megan Timpf was born.
- 1985 – Canada abolishes its blue laws nationwide; thus allowing Port Dover businesses the opportunity to have a 7-day business week. Even today, some businesses are closed on Sunday not for legal reasons but due to the beliefs of the proprietor(s).

=== 21st Century ===
==== 2000s ====
- October 13, 2000 – The first Friday the 13th celebrations for motorcycle riders in the 21st century was held on this date.
- 2001 – Nanticoke and all other municipalities within the region were dissolved and the region was divided into two single tier municipalities with city-status but called counties.
- May 15, 2001 – The decimated youth demographics of Port Dover start to endanger the future of Port Dover Composite School.
- 2004 – The Stanley Cup came to Port Dover (with Jassen Cullimore) when the 2003–04 Tampa Bay Lightning won the Cup. He was the fourth NHL player to present the Stanley Cup to this small hockey town on the shore of Lake Erie.
- 2005 – The Canadian Coast Guard stationed the Cape-class motor lifeboat CCGS Cape Lambton in the community.
- May 2006 – A boom in wind turbines begins throughout Norfolk County. Plans to build wind turbines in the Port Dover area by 2013 were eventually eliminated by a county-wide ban.
- 2009 – Certain segments of the American horror film Survival of the Dead were filmed here in Port Dover.
- March 4, 2009 – U.S. Steel announced the closure of the Stelco Lake Erie Works in Nanticoke, Ontario due to the increasingly worse effects of the global economic slowdown. While it may have decreased the local pollution levels, the lockout has affected at least 12,000 Canadian jobs; leaving people with little or no disposable income to spend on consumer items.

==== 2010s ====
- April 23, 2010 – Stelco Lake Erie Works finally re-opened after the eight-month lockout; bringing back approximately 1100 people into the company. Approximately 400 people never got their jobs back at the steel mill simply because they were either too old, moved on to other careers, turned to welfare, or went back to college.
- Summer 2010 – Most other local jobs lost during the global recession of the period were eventually restored; resulting in a major drop in the local unemployment rate for the summer of 2010.
- January 31, 2013 – Port Dover Composite School was official closed on this day due to government cutbacks and demographics issues. The Canada 2011 Census reported that there are 1,800 fewer children and teenagers in the Port Dover area as opposed to the Canada 2001 Census.
- April 15, 2013 – The union vote ratification for Stelco Lake Erie Works is set to expire on this date. This brought 12,000 Canadian jobs into immediate danger as they were through most of 2009 and 2010.
- April 28, 2013 – Negotiations between the President of USW Local Union 8782 and the Director of Human Resources of U.S. Steel Canada failed; resulting in a lockout that prevented all Stelco employees from working.
- May 14, 2013 – Norfolk County has banned the placement of new wind turbines; county official feared the region becoming "industrialized" and "unnatural" within the course of 100 years. Wind turbines built before 2013 are permitted to stay until they no longer function properly.
- June 13, 2013 – Despite the lockout at Stelco Lake Erie Works, 2600 people have officially joined the workforce between June 2012 and June 2013 in Norfolk County. Increasing reliance on the economy of the Greater Toronto Area and the globalized economy at large has served to slowly bring Port Dover residents (along with other Norfolk County residents) back into the workforce.
- September 1, 2013 – 71% of voting union members at the Stelco Lake Erie Works appeased to the company's way of thinking and signed a five-year contract that would guarantee work until September 1, 2018. While basic salaries have remained the same, there has been a cut in vacation premiums that allowed them to get paid while on vacation.
- September 5, 2013 – The old PDCS building was converted into an elementary school called Lakewood Public School. They begin to receive their first batch of students from grade 1 through grade 8.
- September 1, 2018 – The current collective bargaining agreement for Stelco Lake Erie Works expires on this date. Union members may sign another CBA or go on lockout pending an authorized union vote.
