= CCGS Cape Naden =

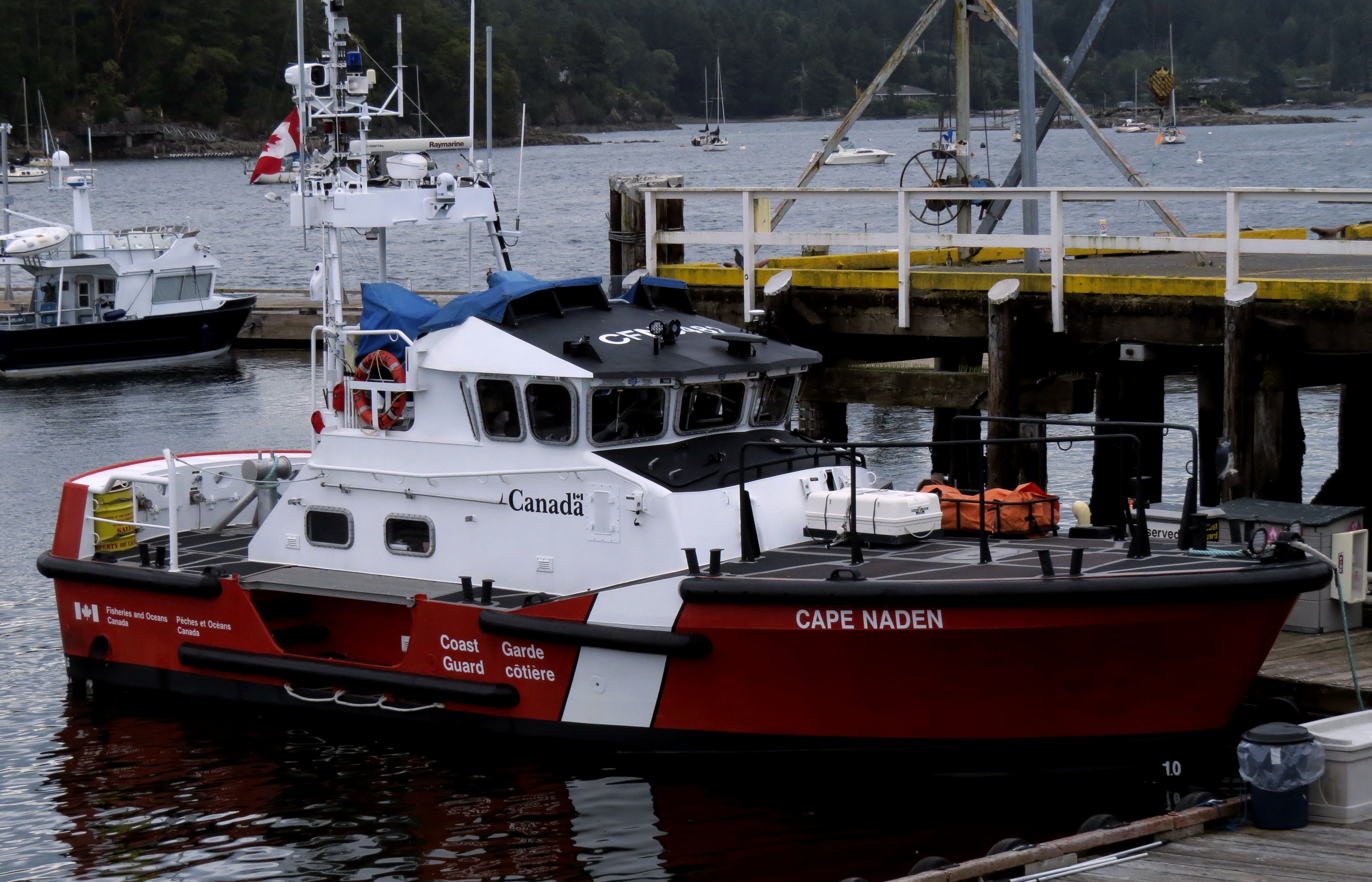
- CCGS Cape Naden at Ganges Harbour, Saltspring Island, Canada

History

Canada
- Name: Cape Naden
- Operator: Canadian Coast Guard
- Builder: Victoria Shipyards, Victoria, British Columbia
- Commissioned: 2011
- Home port: Pat Bay
- Identification: MMSI number: 316017162; Callsign: CFN5482
- Status: in active service

General characteristics
- Class & type: Cape-class motor lifeboat
- Tonnage: 33.8 GT
- Length: 14.6 m (47 ft 11 in)
- Beam: 4.27 m (14 ft 0 in)
- Draft: 1.37 m (4 ft 6 in)
- Speed: 25 knots (46 km/h; 29 mph)
- Range: 200 nmi (370 km; 230 mi)
- Endurance: 1 day
- Complement: 4

CCGS Cape Naden is one of the Canadian Coast Guard's 36 Cape-class motor lifeboat. Cape Naden was built at the Victoria Shipyards, in Victoria, British Columbia. Keith Ashfield Canada's Minister of Fisheries and Oceans and Minister for the Atlantic Gateway officiated at the vessel's dedication at Pat Bay.

== Design ==
Like all Cape-class motor lifeboats, Cape Naden has a displacement of 18 tonnes (20 short tons), a total length of 14.61 metres (47 ft 11 in) and a beam of 4.3 metres (14 ft). Constructed from marine-grade aluminium, it has a draught of 1.37 metres (4 ft 6 in). It contains two, computer-operated Caterpillar 3196 diesel engines. Providing a combined 900 shaft horsepower (670 kW). It has two 28-by-36-inch (710 mm × 910 mm) four-blade propellers, and its complement is four crew members and five passengers.

The lifeboat has a maximum speed of 25 knots (46 km/h; 29 mph) and a cruising speed of 22 knots (41 km/h; 25 mph). Cape-class lifeboats have fuel capacities of 1,500 litres; 330 imperial gallons (400 US gal) and ranges of 200 nautical miles (370 km; 230 mi) when cruising. Cape Naden is capable of operating at wind speeds of 50 knots (93 km/h; 58 mph) and wave heights of 9.1 metres (30 ft). It can tow ships with displacements of up to 150 tonnes (170 short tons) and can withstand 60-knot (110 km/h; 69 mph) winds and 6.1-metre (20 ft)-high breaking waves.

Communication options include Raytheon 152 HF-SSB and Motorola Spectra 9000 VHF50W radios, and a Raytheon RAY 430 loudhailer system. The boat also supports the Simrad TD-L1550 VHF-FM radio direction finder. Raytheon provides a number of other electronic systems for the lifeboat, including the RAYCHART 620, the ST 30 heading indicator and ST 50 depth indicator, the NAV 398 global positioning system, a RAYPILOT 650 autopilot system, and either the R41X AN or SPS-69 radar systems.
