= CCGS Cap Percé =

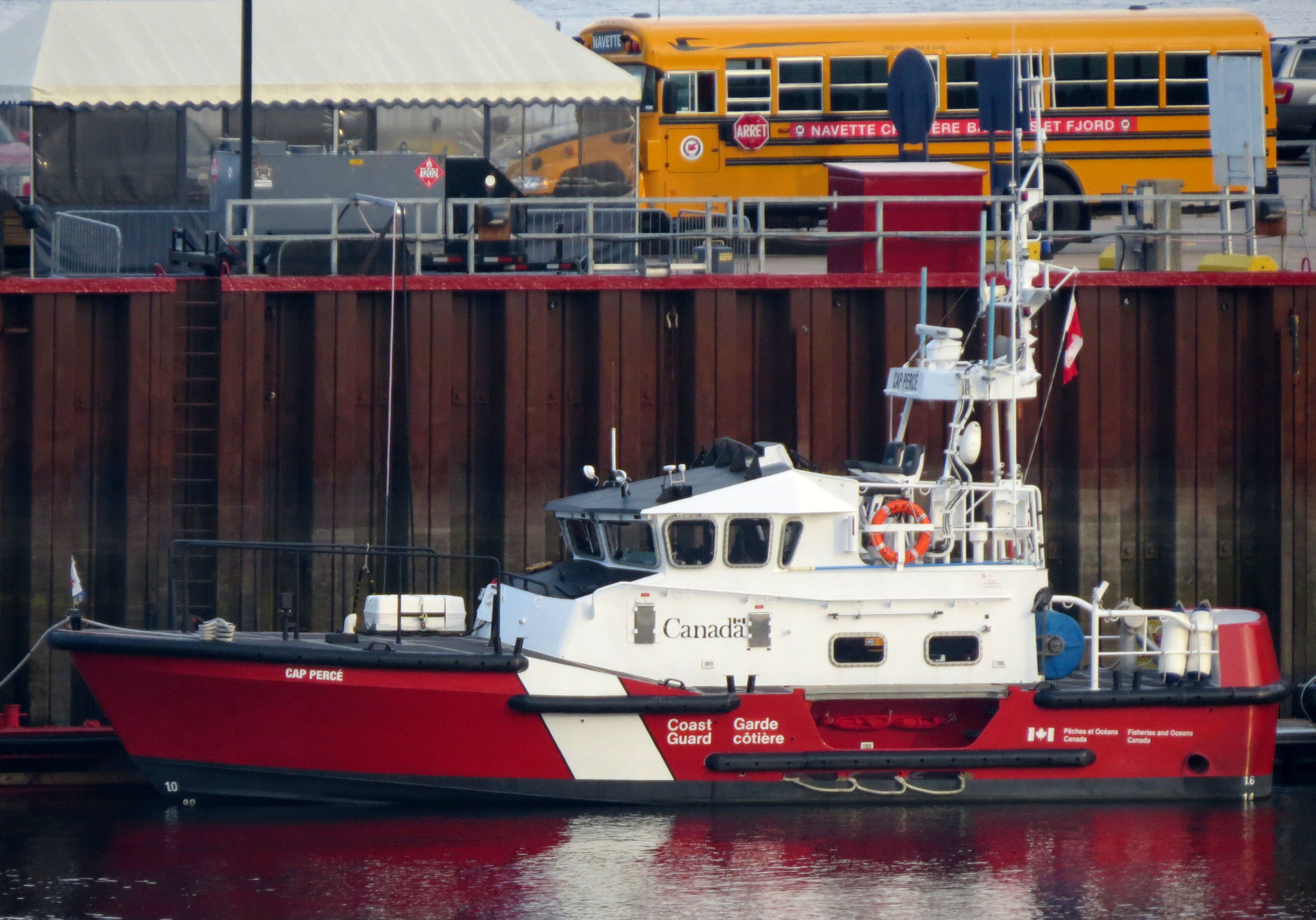
- CCGS Cap Percé at Tadoussac, Quebec

History

Canada
- Name: Cap Percé
- Operator: Canadian Coast Guard
- Port of registry: Ottawa, Ontario
- Builder: Victoria Shipyards Limited, Victoria, British Columbia
- Yard number: 827262
- Christened: 2009
- Home port: CCG Base Kegashka, Quebec - Quebec Region and various other ports in Maritime Region
- Identification: MMSI number: 316013913
- Status: in active service

General characteristics
- Class & type: Cape-class motor lifeboat
- Tonnage: 33.8 GT
- Length: 14.6 m (47 ft 11 in)
- Beam: 4.27 m (14 ft 0 in)
- Draught: 1.37 m (4 ft 6 in)
- Propulsion: 2 × diesel electric engines, 675 kW (905 hp)
- Speed: 22 knots (41 km/h; 25 mph) cruise
- Range: 200 nmi (370 km; 230 mi)
- Endurance: 1 day
- Complement: 4

CCGS Cap Percé is one of the Canadian Coast Guard's 36 Cape-class motor lifeboats. She was scheduled to be stationed at a new Coast Guard station in Kegaska, Quebec, on the Gulf of St Lawrence. Like her sister ships she will be staffed by a crew of four, two of whom will be search and rescue technicians.

According to Gail Shea, Minister of Fisheries and Oceans Canada: "Given the intensive commercial fishing activities and the pleasure boat and ship traffic that characterize the area, Kegaska is a strategic location for a Canadian Coast Guard lifeboat station. Furthermore, this will allow us to consolidate our coverage in this critical sector of the Gulf of St. Lawrence."

== Design ==
Like all Cape-class motor lifeboats, Cap Percé has a displacement of 20 short tons (18 t), a total length of 47 feet 11 inches (14.61 m) and a beam of 14 feet (4.3 m). Constructed from marine-grade aluminium, it has a draught of 4 feet 6 inches (1.37 m). It contains two computer-operated Detroit DDEC-III 6V-92TA diesel engines providing a combined 870 shaft horsepower (650 kW). It has two 28-by-36-inch (710 mm × 910 mm) four-blade propellers, and its complement is four crew members and five passengers.

The lifeboat has a maximum speed of 25 knots (46 km/h; 29 mph) and a cruising speed of 22 knots (41 km/h; 25 mph). Cape-class lifeboats have fuel capacities of 400 US gallons (1,500 L; 330 imp gal) and ranges of 200 nautical miles (370 km; 230 mi) when cruising. Cap Percé is capable of operating at wind speeds of 50 knots (93 km/h; 58 mph) and wave heights of 30 feet (9.1 m). It can tow ships with displacements of up to 150 tonnes (170 short tons) and can withstand 60-knot (110 km/h; 69 mph) winds and 20-foot (6.1 m)-high breaking waves.

Communication options include Raytheon 152 HF-SSB and Motorola Spectra 9000 VHF50W radios, and a Raytheon RAY 430 loudhailer system. The boat also supports the Simrad TD-L1550 VHF-FM radio direction finder. Raytheon provides a number of other electronic systems for the lifeboat, including the RAYCHART 620, the ST 30 heading indicator and ST 50 depth indicator, the NAV 398 global positioning system, a RAYPILOT 650 autopilot system, and either the R41X AN or SPS-69 radar systems.
