= CCGS Cape Fox =

Canadian Coast Guard motor lifeboat

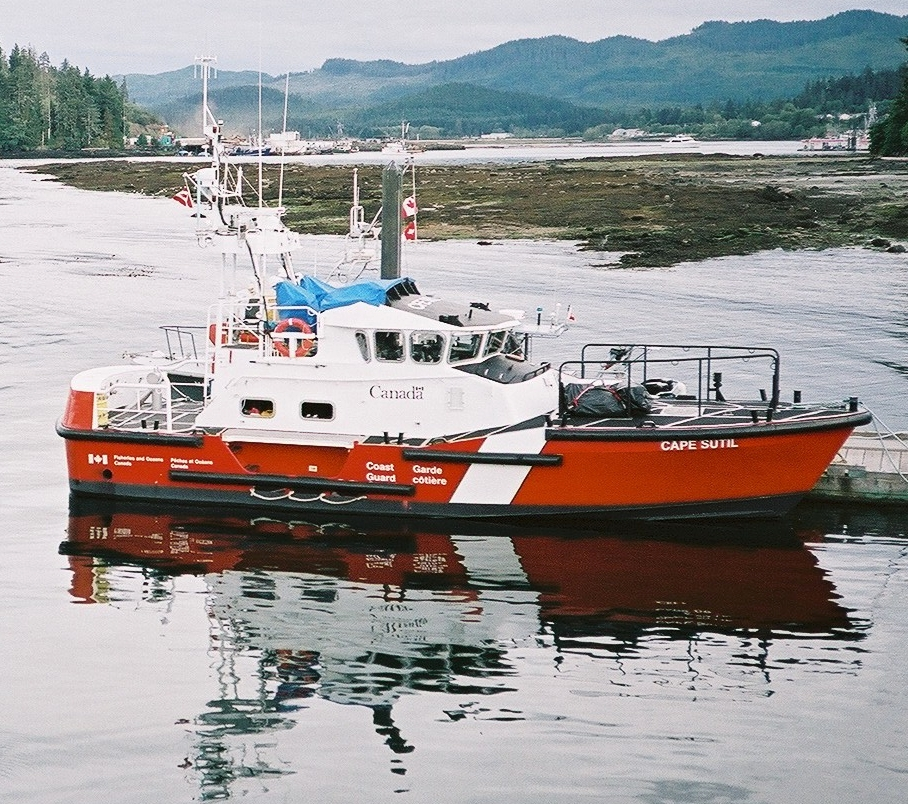
- Sister ship CCGS Cape Sutil at Port Hardy

History

Canada
- Name: Cape Fox
- Namesake: Cape Fox
- Operator: Canadian Coast Guard
- Builder: Victoria Shipyards, Victoria, British Columbia
- Yard number: 824504
- Christened: 2008
- Home port: CCG Base Lark Harbour, Newfoundland and Labrador
- Identification: MMSI number: 316002527
- Status: in active service

General characteristics
- Class & type: Cape-class motor lifeboat
- Tonnage: 33.8 GT; 25.3 NT
- Length: 14.6 m (47 ft 11 in)
- Beam: 4.27 m (14 ft 0 in)
- Draft: 1.37 m (4 ft 6 in)
- Propulsion: 2 × diesel electric engines, 675 kW (905 hp)
- Speed: 22 knots (41 km/h) cruise
- Range: 200 nmi (370 km)
- Endurance: 1 day
- Complement: 4

CCGS Cape Fox is one of the Canadian Coast Guard's 36 Cape-class motor lifeboats. She and a sister vessel, CCGS Cape Norman, serve the western coast of Newfoundland. Her home port is Lark Harbour.

Cape Fox and Cape Norman were built in 2002 at Victoria Shipyards, Victoria, British Columbia. The two vessels were shipped from Vancouver to New York City aboard another vessel, where they proceeded under their own power.

== Design ==
Like all Cape-class motor lifeboats, Cape Fox has a displacement of 20 short tons (18 t) and a total length of 47 feet 11 inches (14.61 m) and a beam of 14 feet (4.3 m). Constructed from marine-grade aluminium, it has a draught of 4 feet 6 inches (1.37 m). It contains two computer-operated Detroit DDEC-III 6V-92TA diesel engines providing a combined 870 shaft horsepower (650 kW). It has two 28 by 36 inches (710 mm × 910 mm) four-blade propellers, and its complement is four crew members and five passengers.

The lifeboat has a maximum speed of 25 knots (46 km/h; 29 mph) and a cruising speed of 22 knots (41 km/h; 25 mph). Cape-class lifeboats have fuel capacities of 400 US gallons (1,500 L; 330 imp gal) and ranges of 200 nautical miles (370 km; 230 mi) when cruising. Cape Fox is capable of operating at wind speeds of 50 knots (93 km/h; 58 mph) and wave heights of 30 feet (9.1 m). It can tow ships with displacements of up to 150 tonnes (170 short tons) and can withstand 60-knot (110 km/h; 69 mph) winds and 20-foot (6.1 m)-high breaking waves.

Communication options include Raytheon 152 HF-SSB and Motorola Spectra 9000 VHF50W radios, and a Raytheon RAY 430 loudhailer system. The boat also supports the Simrad TD-L1550 VHF-FM radio direction finder. Raytheon provides a number of other electronic systems for the lifeboat, including the RAYCHART 620, the ST 30 heading indicator and ST 50 depth indicator, the NAV 398 global positioning system, a RAYPILOT 650 autopilot system, and either the R41X AN or SPS-69 radar systems.
