= CCGS Thunder Cape =

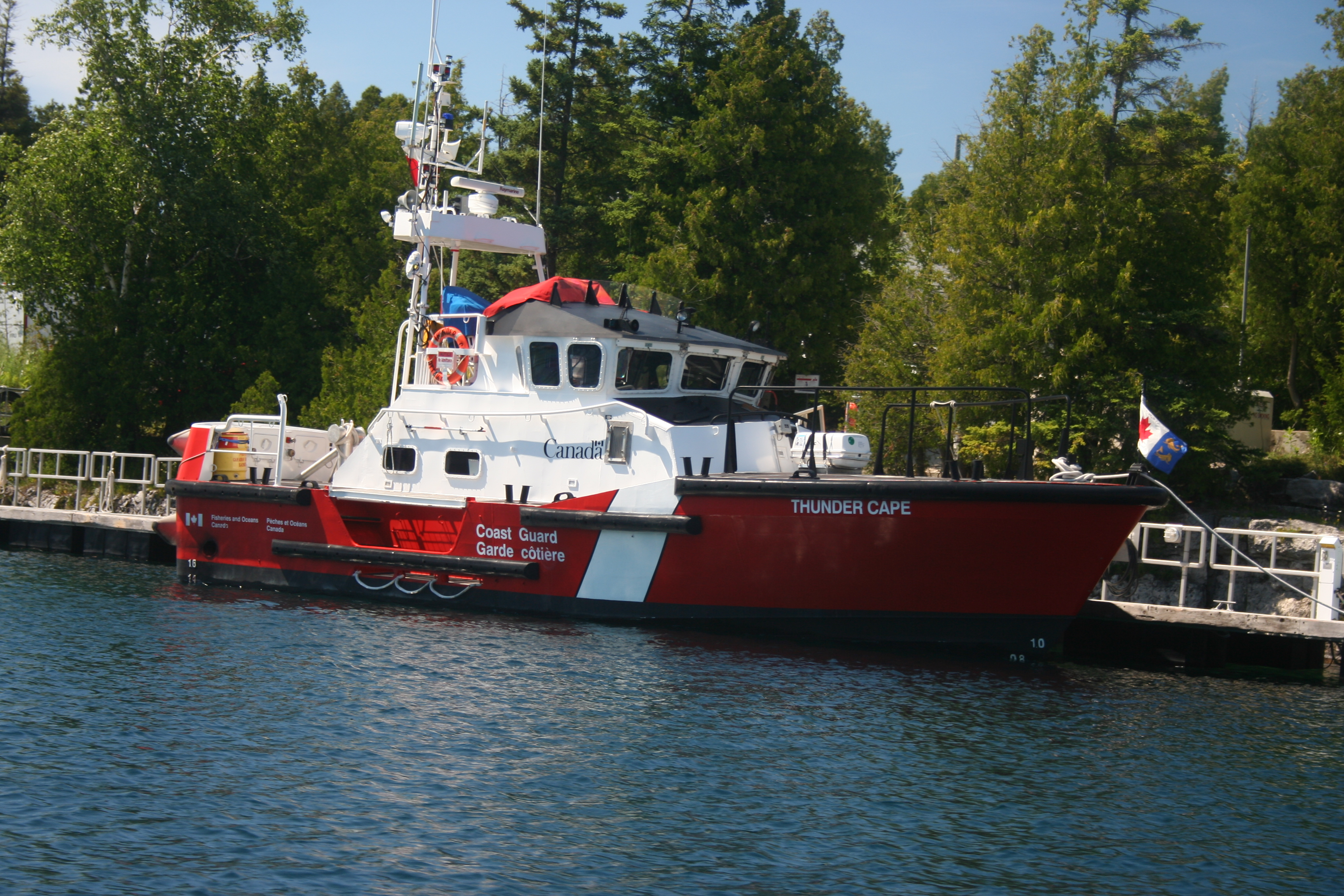
- CCGS Thunder Cape in Tobermory, Ontario

History

Canada
- Name: Thunder Cape
- Operator: Canadian Coast Guard
- Builder: MIL Systems and MetalCraft Marine, Kingston
- Commissioned: 2000
- Home port: CCG Base Meaford, Ontario
- Identification: MMSI number: 316005382; Callsign: CG8047
- Status: in active service

General characteristics
- Class & type: Cape-class motor lifeboat
- Tonnage: 33.8 GT
- Length: 14.6 m (47 ft 11 in)
- Beam: 4.27 m (14 ft 0 in)
- Draft: 1.37 m (4 ft 6 in)
- Ice class: Arctic Class 2
- Propulsion: Diesel - 2 × Caterpillar 3196
- Speed: 25 knots (46 km/h)
- Range: 200 nmi (370 km)
- Endurance: 1 day
- Complement: 4

CCGS Thunder Cape is one of the Canadian Coast Guard's 36 Cape-class motor lifeboats. She was built in Kingston, Ontario, in 2000, by MetalCraft Marine and MIL Systems and was moved to Goderich, Ontario, in October 2005. Assigned to the Central and Arctic Region, the lifeboat serves the Lake Erie area. The boat is backed up by search and rescue operations from 424 Transport and Rescue Squadron (at CFB Trenton). The Thunder Cape was damaged in a collision with the breakwater at the outlet of the Mission River in Thunder Bay.

== Design ==
Like all Cape-class motor lifeboats, Thunder Cape has a displacement of 20 short tons (18 t) and a total length of 47 feet 11 inches (14.61 m) and a beam of 14 feet (4.3 m). Constructed from marine-grade aluminium, it has a draught of 4 feet 6 inches (1.37 m). It contains two computer-operated Detroit DDEC-III 6V-92TA diesel engines providing a combined 870 shaft horsepower. It has two 28 by 36 inches (710 mm × 910 mm) four-blade propellers, and its complement is four crew members and five passengers.

The lifeboat has a maximum speed of 25 knots (46 km/h; 29 mph) and a cruising speed of 22 knots (41 km/h; 25 mph). Cape-class lifeboats have fuel capacities of 400 US gallons (1,500 L; 330 imp gal) and ranges of 200 nautical miles (370 km; 230 mi) when cruising. Thunder Cape is capable of operating at wind speeds of 50 knots (93 km/h; 58 mph) and wave heights of 30 feet (9.1 m). It can tow ships with displacements of up to 150 tonnes (170 short tons) and can withstand 60 knots (110 km/h; 69 mph) winds and 20 feet (6.1 m)-high breaking waves.

Communication options include Raytheon 152 HF-SSB and Motorola Spectra 9000 VHF50W radios, and a Raytheon RAY 430 loudhailer system. The boat also supports the Simrad TD-L1550 VHF-FM radio direction finder. Raytheon provides a number of other electronic systems for the lifeboat, including the RAYCHART 620, the ST 30 heading indicator and ST 50 depth indicator, the NAV 398 global positioning system, a RAYPILOT 650 autopilot system, and either the R41X AN or SPS-69 radar systems.
