= CCGS Cape Lambton =

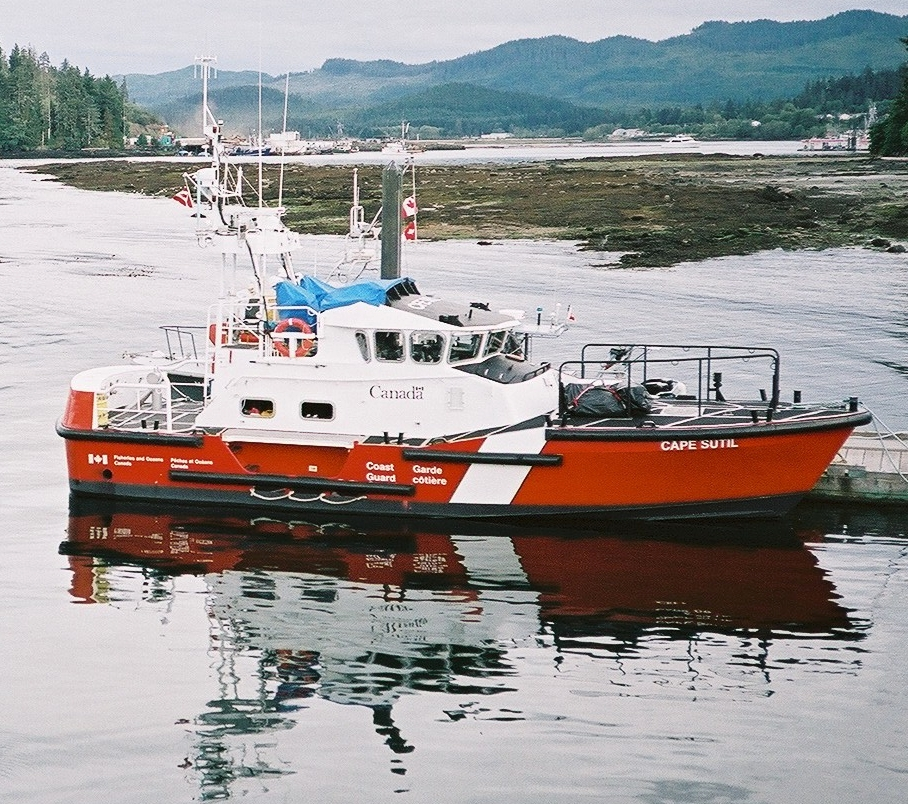
- Sister ship, CCGS Cape Sutil at CCG Station Port Hardy

History

Canada
- Name: Cape Lambton
- Namesake: Geographical feature within the region
- Operator: Canadian Coast Guard
- Port of registry: Ottawa, Ontario
- Builder: MIL Systems and MetalCraft Marine, Kingston
- Yard number: 822796
- Christened: Margaret Matthews
- Commissioned: 2000
- Home port: CCG Base Port Weller, Ontario – Central and Arctic Region
- Identification: MMSI number: 316005379; Callsign: CG8049
- Status: in active service

General characteristics
- Class & type: Cape-class motor lifeboat
- Displacement: 18t (20 short tons)
- Length: 14.6 m (47 ft 11 in)
- Beam: 4.27 m (14 ft 0 in)
- Draft: 1.37 m (4 ft 6 in)
- Propulsion: Geared diesel engine, 671 kW (900 hp)
- Speed: 25 knots (46 km/h; 29 mph) maximum
- Range: 200 nautical miles (370 km; 230 mi)
- Endurance: 1 day
- Complement: 4
- Notes: Vessel number 6 in series.

CCGS Cape Lambton is one of the Canadian Coast Guard's 36 Cape-class motor lifeboats. The vessel was built in 2000, in Kingston, Ontario and was stationed in Port Weller, on Lake Ontario, in March 2021. The ship is named for the southern tip of Banks Island in the Northwest Territories and in turn named for Lord Durham, John Lambton, 1st Earl of Durham.

== Design ==
Like all Cape-class motor lifeboats, Cape Lambton has a displacement of 20 short tons (18 t) and a total length of 47 feet 11 inches (14.61 m) and a beam length of 14 feet (4.3 m). Constructed from marine-grade aluminium, it has a draught length of 4 feet 6 inches (1.37 m). It contains two computer-operated Detroit DDEC-III 6V-92TA diesel engines providing a combined 870 shaft horsepower (650 kW). It has two 28 by 36 inches (710 mm × 910 mm) four-blade propellers, and its complement is four crew members and five passengers.

The lifeboat has a maximum speed of 25 knots (46 km/h; 29 mph) and a cruising speed of 22 knots (41 km/h; 25 mph). Cape-class lifeboats have fuel capacities of 400 US gallons (1,500 L; 330 imp gal) and ranges of 200 nautical miles (370 km; 230 mi) when cruising. Cape Lambton is capable of operating at wind speeds of 50 knots (93 km/h; 58 mph) and wave heights of 30 feet (9.1 m). It can tow ships with displacements of up to 150 tonnes (170 short tons) and can withstand 60 knots (110 km/h; 69 mph) winds and 20 feet (6.1 m)-high breaking waves.

Communication options include Raytheon 152 HF-SSB and Motorola Spectra 9000 VHF50W radios, and a Raytheon RAY 430 loudhailer system. The boat also supports the Simrad TD-L1550 VHF-FM radio direction finder. Raytheon provides a number of other electronic systems for the lifeboat, including the RAYCHART 620, the ST 30 heading indicator and ST 50 depth indicator, the NAV 398 global positioning system, a RAYPILOT 650 autopilot system, and either the R41X AN or SPS-69 radar systems.
