= CCGS Cape Spry =

- CCGS Cape Spry at Souris, Prince Edward Island, Canada

History

Canada
- Name: Cape Spry
- Namesake: Cape Spry on Eastern Prince Edward Island near the town of Souris
- Operator: Canadian Coast Guard
- Builder: Victoria Shipyard Ltd., Victoria, British Columbia
- Completed: 2003
- Home port: CCG Base – Souris, Prince Edward Island
- Identification: MMSI number: 316004846
- Status: In active service

General characteristics
- Class & type: Cape-class motor lifeboat
- Tonnage: 33.8 GT; 25.3 NT
- Length: 14.6 m (47 ft 11 in)
- Beam: 4.27 m (14 ft 0 in)
- Draft: 1.37 m (4 ft 6 in)
- Propulsion: 2 × diesel electric engines, 671 kW (900 hp)
- Speed: 22 knots (41 km/h) cruise
- Range: 200 nmi (370 km)
- Complement: 4 (2 officers and 2 crew)

CCGS Cape Spry (Note: CCGS stands for Canadian Coast Guard Ship) is a Cape-class lifeboat in the Canadian Coast Guard Service, stationed at Souris, Prince Edward Island.

== Design ==
Like all Cape-class motor lifeboats, Cape Spry has a displacement of 20 short tons (18 t) and a total length of 47 feet 11 inches (14.61 m) and a beam of 14 feet (4.3 m). Constructed from marine-grade aluminium, it has a draught of 4 feet 6 inches (1.37 m). The vessel is powered by two Caterpillar 3196 diesel engines driving dual propellers. Its crew complement is four with two being officers.

The lifeboat has a maximum speed of 25 knots (46 km/h; 29 mph) and a cruising speed of 22 knots (41 km/h; 25 mph). Cape-class lifeboats have fuel capacities of 400 US gallons (1,500 L; 330 imp gal) and ranges of 200 nautical miles (370 km; 230 mi) when cruising. Cape Spry is capable of operating at wind speeds of 50 knots (93 km/h; 58 mph) and wave heights of 30 feet (9.1 m). It can tow ships with displacements of up to 150 tonnes (170 short tons) and can withstand 60-knot (110 km/h; 69 mph) winds and 20-foot (6.1 m)-high breaking waves.

Communication options include Bendix-King KY196 VHF AM, Ross DSC 500 VHF FM and Motorola Micom HF radios. The boat has an Anschutz Gyrostar II gyro and a Furtuno 1942 X Band radar system. Other electronic systems for this lifeboat include an ICAN Aldebaran II electric charting system, JMC DF5500 VHF depth indicator, Si-Tex Koden CVS 106 depth sounder, Magnavox MX400B global positioning system and a Comnav 2001 autopilot system

== See also ==
- 47-foot Motor Lifeboat
