= Cape-class motor lifeboat =

1997 Canadian Coast Guard ship class

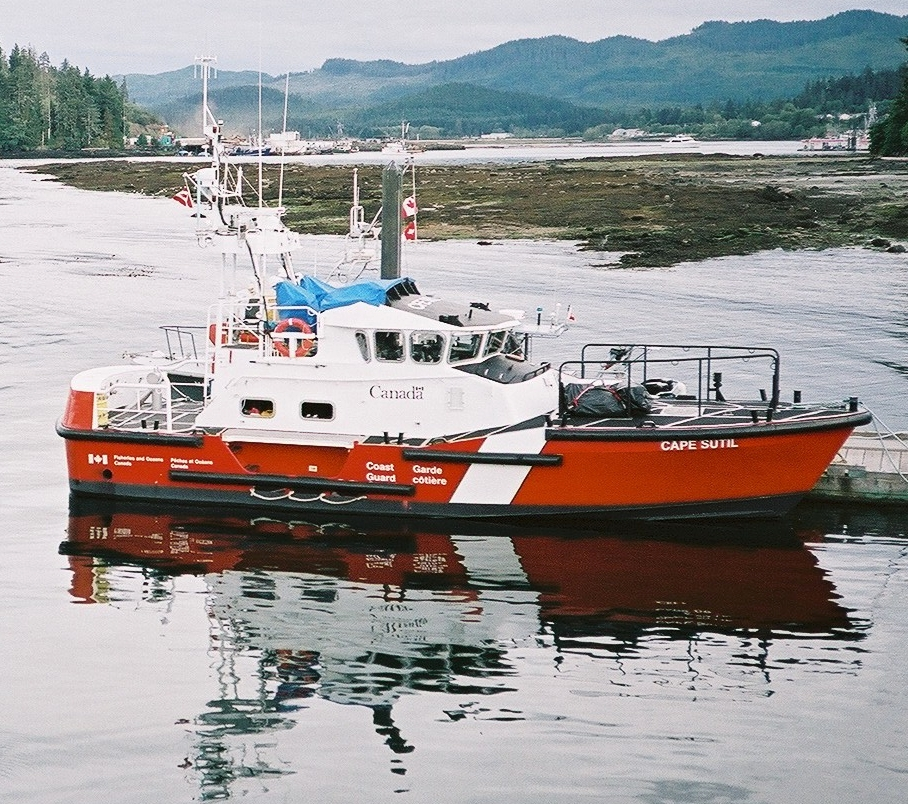
- CCGS Cape Sutil at Port Hardy, British Columbia.

Class overview
- Name: Cape class
- Builders: MIL-Davie with Metalcraft Marine Inc and Victoria Shipyards
- Operators: Canadian Coast Guard
- Preceded by: Arun class
- Succeeded by: Bay class
- Cost: US $1,214,300
- In service: 1997–present
- Planned: 36
- Completed: 36

General characteristics
- Type: Search and rescue motor lifeboat
- Displacement: 33.79 GT; 25.34 NT
- Length: 14.6 m (47 ft 11 in)
- Beam: 4.27 m (14 ft 0 in)
- Draught: 1.42 m (4 ft 8 in)
- Propulsion: 2 × Caterpillar 3196 diesel engines rated 450 hp (340 kW) at 2,100 rpm (373 usable imperial gallons) fuel capacity
- Speed: 25 knots (46 km/h; 29 mph) maximum
- Range: 200 nmi (370 km; 230 mi) at 22 knots (41 km/h; 25 mph)
- Complement: 4 crew, 5 passengers

The Canadian Coast Guard (CCG) maintains a fleet of 14.6 m (47 ft 11 in) Cape-class motor lifeboats based on a motor lifeboat design used by the United States Coast Guard. In September 2009 the CCG announced plans to add five new lifeboats, bringing the total number of Cape-class lifeboats to 36. In 2021 a contract was awarded to Ocean Pacific Marine to upgrade the Cape class over a seven-year period.

The vessels are staffed by a crew of four, of which at least one is a rescue specialist. In spite of its name, CCGS Cape Roger is a larger patrol vessel, not a Cape-class lifeboat. The CCG also maintains some larger motor Arun-class lifeboats and Bay-class lifeboats.

== Design ==
Cape-class motor lifeboats are assessed at 33.79 gross tonnage (GT), total lengths of 47 feet 11 inches (14.61 m) and beams of 14 feet (4.3 m). Constructed from marine-grade aluminium, ships have a draught of 4 feet 8 inches (1.42 m). They contain two Caterpillar 3196 diesel engines providing a combined 900 shaft horsepower (670 kW). They have two 28-by-36-inch (710 mm × 910 mm) counter-rotating, four-blade propellers. Each ship's complement is four crew members and five passengers.

The lifeboats have a maximum speed of 25 knots (46 km/h; 29 mph) and a cruising speed of 22 knots (41 km/h; 25 mph). Cape-class lifeboats have fuel capacities of 1,560 litres (410 US gal) and an designed operational range of 200 nautical miles (370 km; 230 mi) when cruising. They are capable of operating in sustained wind speeds of 50 knots (93 km/h; 58 mph) and wave heights of 30 feet (9.1 m). They can tow ships with displacements of up to 150 tonnes (170 short tons) and can withstand 60-knot (110 km/h; 69 mph) winds and 20-foot (6.1 m)-high breaking waves. These ships must meet stringent stability requirements.

USCG MLB47 Communication options include Raytheon 152 HF-SSB and Motorola Spectra 9000 VHF50W radios, and a Raytheon RAY 430 loudhailer system. The lifeboats also support the Simrad TD-L1550 VHF-FM radio direction finder. Raytheon provides a number of other electronic systems for the lifeboats, including the RAYCHART 620, the ST 30 heading indicator and ST 50 depth indicator, the NAV 398 global positioning system, a RAYPILOT 650 autopilot system, and either the R41X AN or SPS-69 radar systems

== Class list ==
Cape class
Region	Ship	Notes
Newfoundland and Labrador	Cape Fox	
Newfoundland and Labrador	Cape Norman	
Maritimes	Cap Breton	
Maritimes	Cape Spry	
Maritimes	Cap Nord	
Quebec	Cap d'Espoir	
Quebec	Cap de Rabast	
Quebec	Cap Rozier	
Quebec	Cap Tourmente	
Quebec	Cap Percé	
Central and Arctic	Cape Chaillon	
Central and Arctic	Cape Commodore	
Central and Arctic	Cape Discovery	
Central and Arctic	Cape Dundas	
Central and Arctic	Cape Hearne	
Central and Arctic	Thunder Cape	
Central and Arctic	Cape Mercy	
Central and Arctic	Cape Providence	
Central and Arctic	Cape Lambton	
Central and Arctic	Cape Storm	
Central and Arctic	Cape Rescue	
Pacific	Cape Ann	
Pacific	Cape Cockburn	
Pacific	Cape Farewell	
Pacific	Cape Naden	
Pacific	Cape McKay	
Pacific	Cape Mudge	
Pacific	Cape Sutil	
Pacific	Cape Calvert	
Pacific	Cape Caution	
Pacific	Cape Palmerston	
Pacific	Cape Dauphin	
Pacific	Cape Kuper	
Pacific	Cape St-James	
