= MetalCraft Marine =

Aluminum boat manufacturer

MetalCraft Marine Incorporated
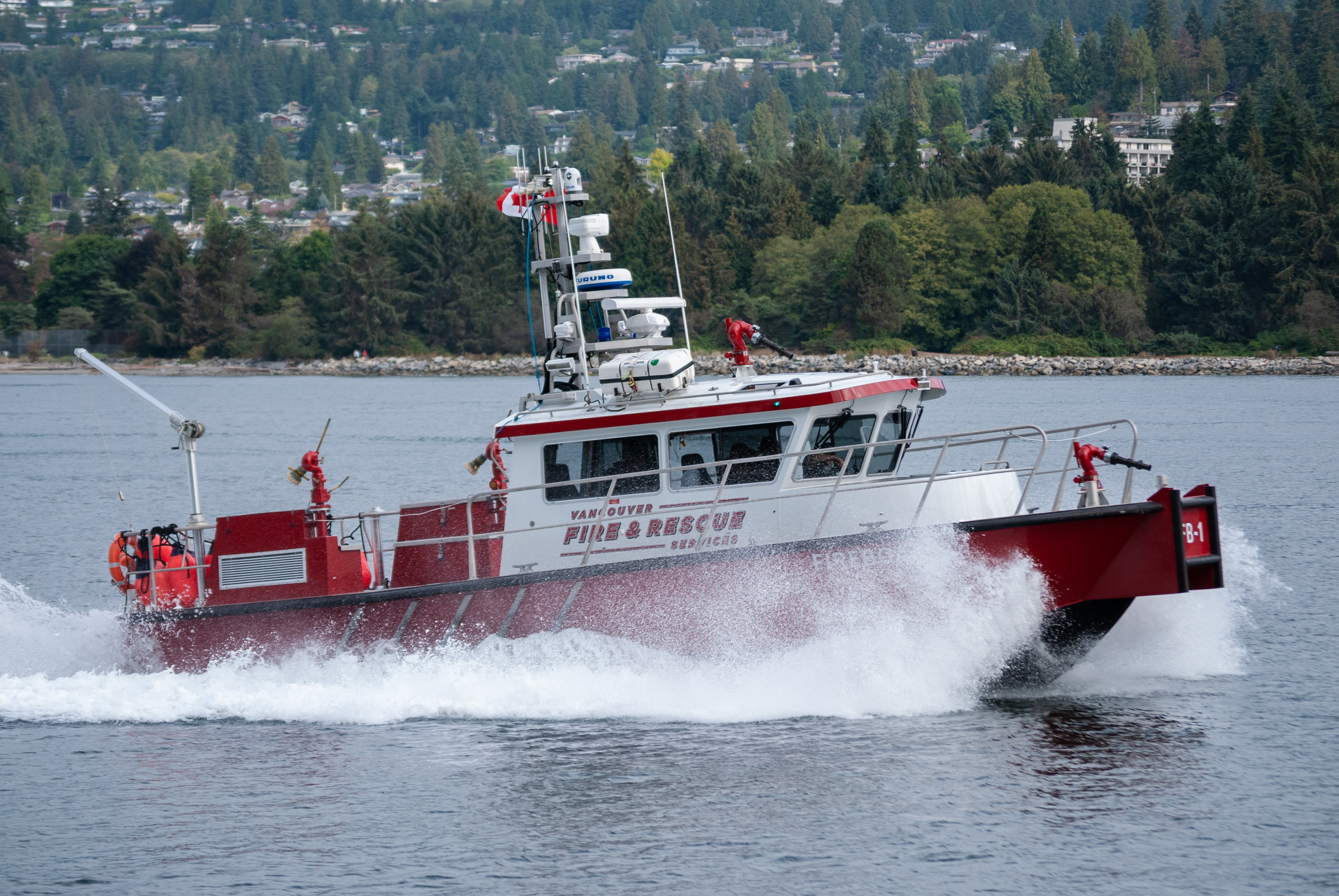
- City of Vancouver, Fireboat 1 (FB-1), built by MetalCraft Marine
- Type: Private Company
- Industry: Aluminum boats
- Founded: 1987; 39 years ago
- Number of locations: Kingston, Ontario; Cape Vincent, New York
- Area served: Worldwide
- Key people: Tom Wroe; Michael Allen; Robert (Bob) Clark
- Number of employees: 105 (2011)
- Website: https://metalcraftmarine.com

MetalCraft Marine (MCM) is an aluminium boat manufacturer located in Kingston, Ontario. In 2012, MCM opened a facility in Cape Vincent, New York after operating in Clayton, New York for many years.

Founded in 1987 by Tom Wroe and Montgomery Smith, MCM has built vessels for organizations and municipal fire departments. Known primarily for their fireboats, MCM also builds work-boats, patrol boats, barges and research vessels. Metal-Craft's American subsidiary won a contract with the United States Coast Guard to deliver up to 10 Long Range Interceptor (LRI-II) vessels, which replace the previous LRI test vessels.

Metal-Craft is best known for its high-speed fire-boat, the Fire-Storm, currently used by the Tampa, Florida Fire Department, the Jacksonville Fire Department, the Boston Fire Department and the Wilmington, Delaware Fire Department. The Houston Port Authority has three Firestorm 70' vessels and Melbourne, Australia has a Firestorm 12M.
