= Seaspan ULC =

Canadian ship-builder

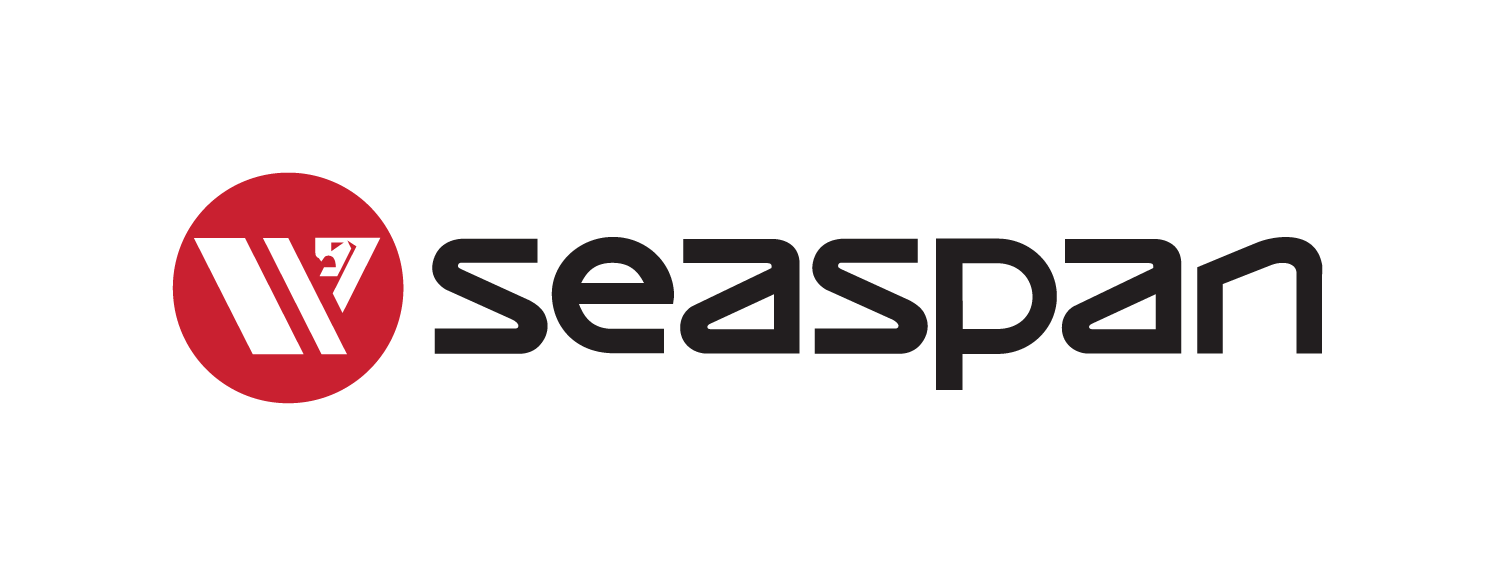
- Type: Private
- Industry: Shipbuilding, Towing, and Short sea shipping
- Predecessor: Seaspan Marine Corporation
- Founded: 1970
- Headquarters: North Vancouver
- Area served: Pacific Northwest
- Revenue: 493,8 millions $ (2025)
- Number of employees: 2,800
- Parent: Atlas Corporation
- Website: www.seaspan.com

Seaspan ULC (formerly Seaspan Marine Corporation) provides marine-related services to the Pacific Northwest. Within the Group are three (3) shipyards, an intermodal ferry and car float business, along with a tug and barge transportation company that serves both domestic and international markets. Seaspan is part of The Washington Companies that is owned by Dennis Washington. Kyle Washington (son of Dennis Washington), is the Executive Chairman of Seaspan, who has become a Canadian citizen.

Seaspan ULC was formerly known as Seaspan Marine Corporation, and prior to that Washington Marine Group.

== Marine transportation ==
=== Seaspan ULC ===
Seaspan ULC evolved into a prominent marine transportation company serving the West Coast of North America with a large tugboat and barge fleet. Seaspan's barges haul forestry materials (logs, wood chips, hog fuel, lumber, pulp, paper and newsprint), minerals (construction aggregate and limestone), railcars, plus machinery, fuel and supplies to coastal communities. Seaspan also provides ship docking services to the Ports of Vancouver, Victoria, Esquimalt and other BC out ports.

=== Seaspan Ferries Corporation ===
Seaspan Ferries Corporation is a commercial roll on - roll off ferry service providing regularly scheduled transportation between British Columbia's Lower Mainland terminal in Delta and Vancouver Island's Nanaimo and Swartz Bay terminals. Based in Delta, B.C., Seaspan Ferries Corporation transports semi-trailer trucks, containers, and rail cars on self-propelled ferries and integrated tug-barge units. The train ferry is the link between the railways on the British Columbia mainland and the Southern Railway of Vancouver Island at Nanaimo.

== Ships ==
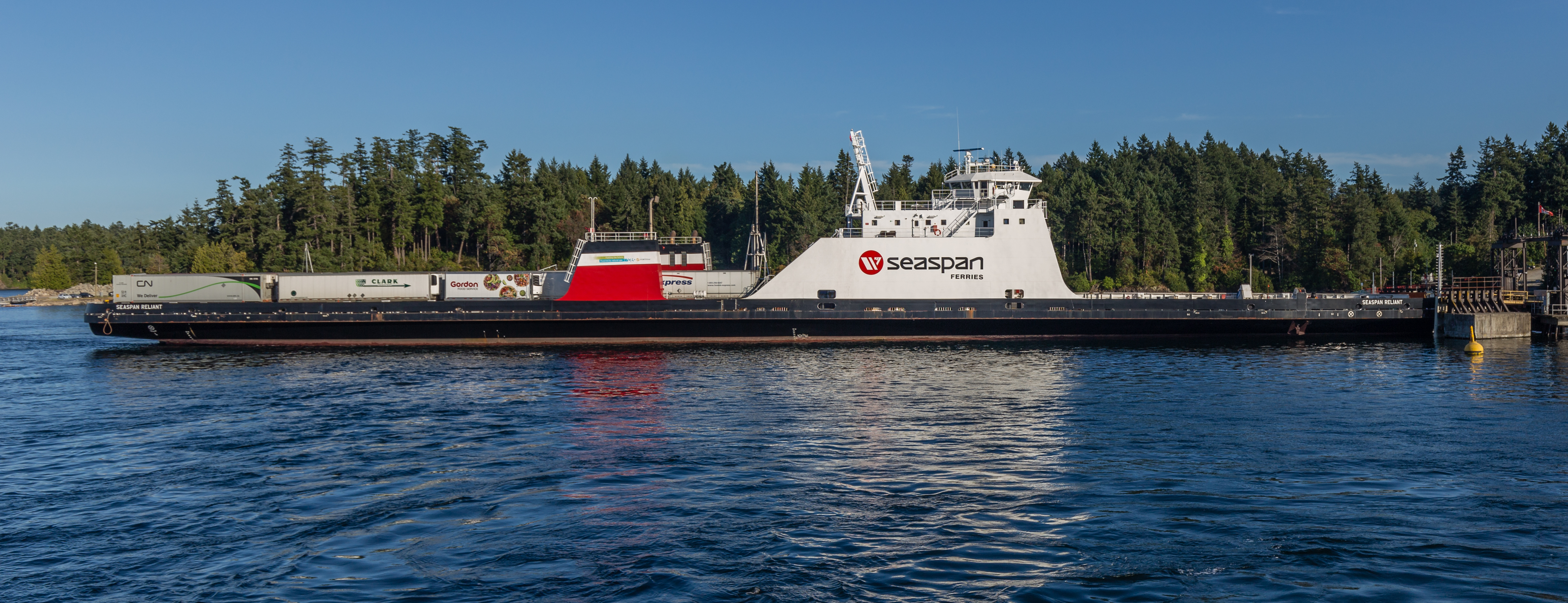
Hybrid ferry Seaspan Reliant in Swartz Bay BC Ferries Terminal, Vancouver Island, British Columbia, Canada

=== Ocean tugs ===
- Seaspan Royal
- Seaspan Commodore
- Seaspan King
- Starpan marine

=== Coastal tugs ===
- Seaspan Pacer
- Seaspan Cavalier
- Seaspan Corsair
- Seaspan Cutlass
- Seaspan Queen
- Seaspan Commander
- Seaspan Champion
- Comox Crown
- HaiSea Guardian
- Seaspan Protector

=== Ship assist & escort tugs ===
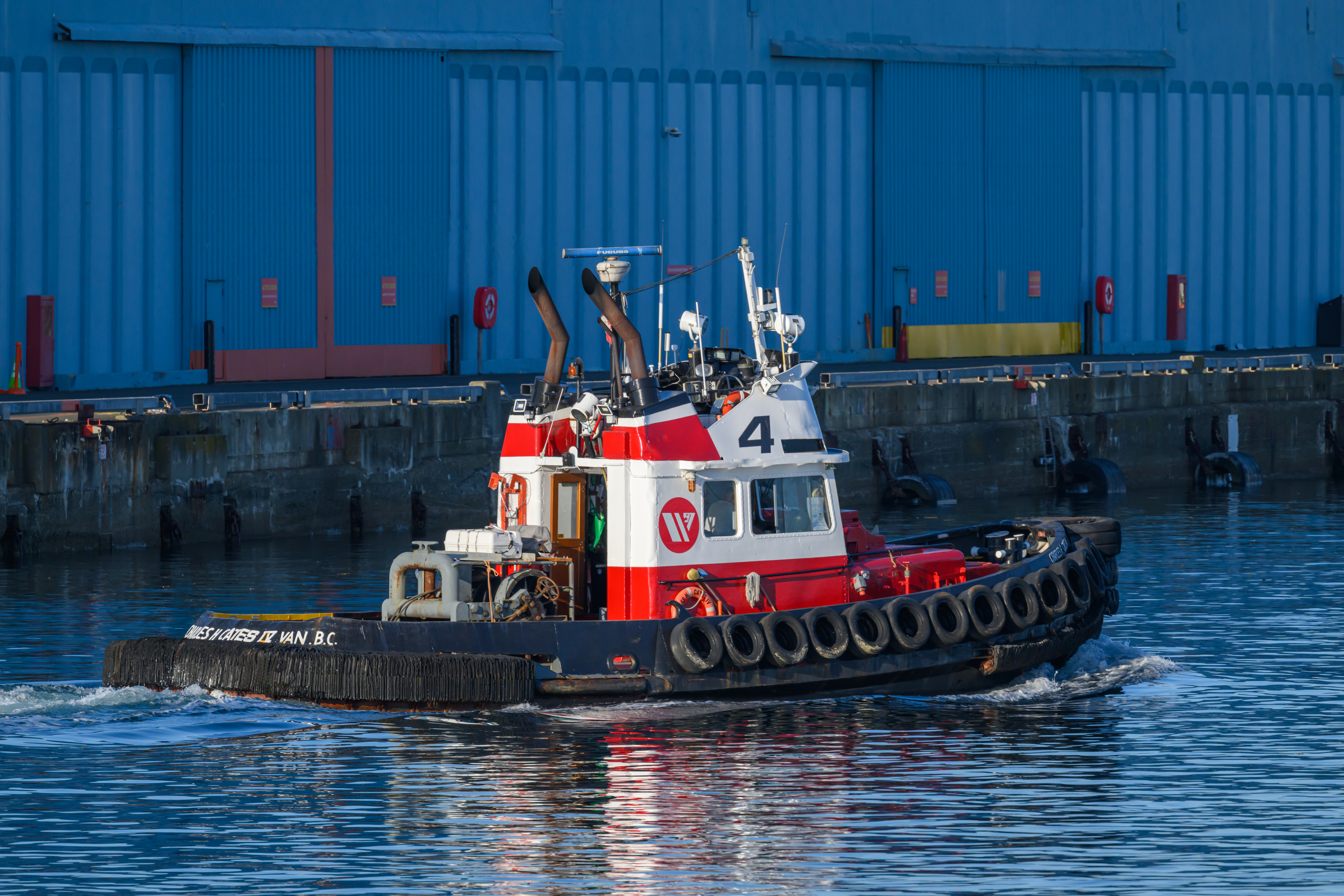
Seaspan ULC tugboat, Charles H. Cates IV, at Ogden Point, BC Canada

- Seaspan Foam
- Ace
- Seaspan Kestrel
- Seaspan Osprey
- Seaspan Resolution
- Seaspan Eagle
- Seaspan Raven
- Seaspan Falcon
- Seaspan Hawk
- Cates #1
- Cates #3
- Cates #4
- Cates #5
- Cates #8
- Cates #10
- Cates #20

=== River tugs ===
- Seaspan Tempest
- Seaspan Venture
- Seaspan Scout
- JRW

=== Ferries ===
- Seaspan Swift: Seaspan's first of two new dual-fueled/hybrid (diesel, liquefied natural gas and battery) ferries.
- Seaspan Reliant: the second of Seaspan's hybrid RNG/LNG-fueled vessel.
- Princess Superior: Former BCCSS (British Columbia Coast Steamship Service) ferry from 1993 to 1998.
- Seaspan Challenger/Coastal Spirit: Barge pusher tug (Challenger ex. Hecate Crown of Crown Zellerbach).
- Seaspan Greg (ex: Greg Yorke): Former F M Yorke & Sons Ltd rail car barge from 1964 to 1972. Renamed to current name in 1974.
- Fraser Link: Barge (ex. Cordova).
- Seaspan Pusher: pushing tugboat pusher Fraser Link (ex. Sealink Pusher).
- Van Isle Link: Barge (ex. Fairbanks). Pushed by Amix tug Arctic Hooper.

=== Development in progress ===
- Protecteur-class auxiliary vessel for Royal Canadian Navy
  - HMCS Protecteur - construction commenced June 2018 with delivery in 2025
  - HMCS Preserver - TBD with delivery expected in 2027

=== Former vessels ===
- Pacificat-class ferries: Built by Catarman Ferries International in North Vancouver. Three ferries bought at auction by Seaspan in 2003 from BC Ferries. In 2009 the three ferries were sold to Abu 6 Mar, a luxury yacht builder. In the six years with Seaspan, the ferries were held in storage where they remained up for sale.
- Seaspan Doris (ex: Doris Yorke): Former F M Yorke & Sons Limited ferry from 1968 to 1972. Built by Victoria Machinery Company of Victoria. Renamed to current name in 1974. As of 2012 the ferry was mothballed in North Vancouver.

== Shipyards ==
Near to Pacific Northwest shipping lanes, Seaspan Shipyards are a resource for the region's important marine industry. The Group's operations consist of three shipyards.

=== Vancouver Drydock ===
Located on the north shore of Vancouver Harbour at the eastern end of the former Burrard Dry Dock site, Vancouver Drydock operates two floating drydocks with lifting capacities of 36,000 tonnes in a Panamax beam dock, and 30,000 tonnes in a self-contained deployable dock.

Seaspan plans to extend the Vancouver Drydock a further 40 metres (130 ft) into Burrard Inlet, and then add three more smaller dry docks to increase its ship repair capacity at this site, to allow for increased shipbuilding efforts at its other sites.

=== Vancouver Shipyards ===
Vancouver Shipyards designs, constructs, maintains, and repairs all types of vessels. The yard's facilities include a major steel forming shop, a large fabrication and assembly hall, a totally enclosed paint facility, and a SyncroLift capable of lifting vessels up to 1,200 tonnes. One of west coasts only LBTS (land based test site) is set up at Vancouver shipyards to test and integrate ship based systems prior to installation on ships.

=== Victoria Shipyards ===
Utilizing the Esquimalt Graving Dock, owned and operated by Public Services and Procurement Canada (formerly Public Works and Government Services Canada), Victoria Shipyards can drydock and repair vessels up to 100,000 DWT. Victoria Shipyards is the largest ship repair company on Canada's Pacific coast.

== Other services ==
=== Marine Petrobulk ===
For over a quarter of a century, Marine Petrobulk has supplied all grades of bunker fuels to vessels entering the ports of Vancouver, New Westminster, Victoria, Prince Rupert, Kitimat and Nanaimo.

== History ==
Seaspan, as it is known today, is the product of a series of acquisitions and mergers in the coastal marine transportation and shipbuilding/ship repair business. Seaspan was created in 1970 by the merger of two prominent coastal towing firms: Vancouver Tug Boat Company (formed in 1898 by Harry A Jones) and Island Tug & Barge (formed in 1924 by Harold Elworthy). In addition to being the largest tug and barge operation on the lower coast, Vancouver Tug also owned Vancouver Shipyards. In 1968 or 1969, Vancouver Tug was acquired by the construction firm Dillingham Corporation, while Island Tug & Barge was acquired by Genstar Ltd. in 1969. The following year, Genstar joined with Dillingham to merge Island Tug and Vancouver Tug into a new corporation, Seaspan International Ltd. (In 1993 the name "Island Tug and Barge" was sold to the Shields family, of Shields Navigation, and the current Island Tug and Barge is not affiliated with Seaspan.)

Another prominent branch of the family tree was C H Cates & Sons Towing, generally known as Cates Towing, which was the primary shipdocking tug outfit in the Port of Vancouver for much of the 20th Century. Captain Charles Henry Cates arrived from Machias, Maine in 1885 and built the first cargo-handling wharf on the North Vancouver waterfront. He expanded into boatbuilding and repair and his tugs towed barges of building stone and assisted ships in Burrard Inlet. In 1913 he formed C H Cates Towing, then joined with his three sons, all master mariners, to incorporate the company as CH Cates and Sons Limited in 1921.

Vancouver Shipyard was founded in 1902 at the foot of Denman Street in Vancouver's Coal Harbour. Primarily a builder of small fishing and pleasure boats, the company built two minesweepers for the Royal Canadian Navy during the Second World War. It was acquired by Vancouver Tug in 1954. In 1968 or 1969, both Vancouver Tug and Vancouver Shipyards were acquired by Dillingham Corporation and moved to their present site at the foot of Pemberton Avenue in North Vancouver, where a larger shipyard was established. Since that time the company has constructed, outfitted, or converted 192 tugs, barges and ferries at the shipyard.

Seaspan acquired many of the assets of the former Versatile Pacific Shipyards in two separate transactions. First, Seaspan and Allied Shipbuilders formed a partnership and, with assistance from both Federal and Provincial governments, created Vancouver Drydock Company to acquire the floating drydocks and some onshore facilities in North Vancouver from the defunct firm. Seaspan later acquired Allied's interest in the company.

Meanwhile, in 1994 Vancouver Shipyards (Esquimalt) Ltd. (now Victoria Shipyards) was created at the Esquimalt Graving Dock to fill the void left when the Yarrows shipyard in Esquimalt went bankrupt. Since then, Victoria Shipyards has become prominent in refitting and repair of cruise ships and vessels of the Royal Canadian Navy, including life-extension servicing of the five Halifax-class frigates based at CFB Esquimalt and the four Victoria-class submarines. It built eight Orca-class patrol vessels for the Royal Canadian Navy, constructed over two dozen search and rescue lifeboats for the Canadian Coast Guard, and assembled and launched the newest Seabus, the Burrard Pacific Breeze.

=== Chronological history of Seaspan ===
( except where noted)

- 1970 - Seaspan International Ltd is created.
- 1972 - Seaspan acquires F.M. Yorke & Sons Ltd.
- 1973 - Genstar purchased Dillingham's interest and obtained full ownership of Seaspan.
- 1977 - Seaspan acquires Gulf of Georgia Towing.
- 1980 - Marine Petrobulk Ltd (50% owned by Seaspan) is created to provide fuelling services to vessels in the ports of Vancouver, New Westminster, Victoria, Nanaimo, Kitimat and Prince Rupert.
- 1986 - Imasco Ltd. acquires Genstar and gains controlling interest in Seaspan, then sells Seaspan to McLuan Capital Group later that year.
- 1992 - Dennis Washington makes his first investment in British Columbia's marine industry by purchasing C. H. Cates & Sons Towing and its subsidiary Seaforth Towing. This is when Washington Marine Group was first formed.
- 1995 - Washington acquires Norsk Towing from Fletcher Challenge.
- 1996 - Washington purchases Seaspan.
- 1997 - Washington purchases Kingcome Navigation from MacMillan Bloedel. Kingcome's roots go back to 1912 when it was formed to tow logs from logging camps to the paper mill in Powell River, British Columbia.
- 1998 - Washington purchases the rail and truck ferry service of Coastal Marine Operations from the Canadian Pacific Railway; it becomes a subsidiary of Seaspan and is renamed Seaspan Coastal Intermodal.
- 1999 - Seaspan, Cates, Seaforth, Norsk and Kingcome are all amalgamated into Seaspan International. Dennis Washington sets up Washington Marine Group with separate divisions for towing, shipbuilding and ship repair, coastal intermodal, and bunkering services.
- 2010 - Vancouver Shipyards is shortlisted for the Federal Government's National Shipbuilding Procurement Strategy (NSPS). The program, worth CAD$35 billion, is planned to build replacement ships for the Royal Canadian Navy and Canadian Coast Guard over a 30-year period. Two Canadian shipyards will be selected, one to build combat vessels, the other non-combat vessels.
- 2011 - In a corporate restructuring, Washington Marine Group is renamed Seaspan Marine Corporation; the shipbuilding, coastal ferries and bunkering services become subsidiaries of the towing division.
- 2011 - As the winning bidder of the $8 billion non-combat package of a $35 billion federal shipbuilding contract on 19 October 2011, Seaspan Marine will build seven and possibly eight vessels for the Canadian Coast Guard and Department of National Defence. These will include scientific research vessels, fisheries vessels, polar icebreaker CCGS Imnaryuaq, and two support vessels for the Royal Canadian Navy.
- 2012 – Seaspan's Vancouver Shipyards commences the $170 million Shipyard Modernization Project in preparation for federal shipbuilding contracts under the NSS program.
- 2014 – Canada's largest permanent gantry crane arrives at Seaspan's Vancouver Shipyards. The crane weighs in at 300 tonnes, stands 80 metres (260 ft) high and spans 76 metres (249 ft).
- 2018 - Victoria Shipyards along with Davie and Halifax Shipyards share a $7 billion contract to maintain and repair the Halifax-class frigates and will be responsible for the five frigates based at CFB Esquimalt.
