= Robert Gordon Teather =

Canadian Cross of Valour recipient (1947–2004)

Robert Gordon Teather CV (1947–2004) was a 28-year veteran of the Royal Canadian Mounted Police (R.C.M.P.) who was awarded the Cross of Valour, Canada's highest award for bravery, for a rescue he performed in 1981.

Cpl. Teather was born in Hamilton, Ontario where he joined the Royal Canadian Mounted Police in September 1967. Upon graduation he began and ended his service in British Columbia RCMP "E" Division. During Cpl. Teather's 30-year career with the RCMP he worked in Uniform Patrol and as a Hostage Taker-Barricaded Person Negotiator. He was also a RCMP Diver and Diving Instructor who lectured to police officers, firefighters, doctors and others throughout Canada and the U.S.A., on diving techniques, underwater crime scene photography, ice diving procedures and many other topics that are diving related. Cpl Teather was also the driving force behind getting a dive team up and operational within "E" Division. It was as a result of his persistence and dedication that the "E" Division Dive Team (known today as the Underwater Recovery Team) was formally recognized on April 1, 1977.

Cpl. Teather died at the age of 57, on November 15, 2004 at Surrey Memorial Hospital of natural causes after a battle with diabetes.

== Rescue ==
On 26 September 1981, Corporal Robert Teather, a member of the Surrey Detachment Diving Team of the R.C.M.P., rescued two fishermen trapped in the overturned hull of a boat. Early that morning, the boat Respond collided with a freighter near the mouth of the Fraser River, in British Columbia. The boat capsized with the two crewmen stranded on board. Cpl. Teather and a colleague arrived on the scene and an exploratory dive proved that only one could enter the hull at a time. Teather was inexperienced in this type of rescue, but was aware that the boat was sinking and that qualified help was miles away. Despite the lack of personnel support and unaware if the two crew members were alive he entered the companionway. As visibility was limited to a few centimetres inside as he made his way into the engine room. Most of the way through the ship was done by touch. When he reached the galley, he opened the door, and made his way to front of the vessel. In an air pocket fouled by diesel fumes he found the two men, one of them a non-swimmer, and their pet dog. He instructed both on the use of underwater breathing equipment, and then took the non-swimmer on his back to safety. The door to the galley that Teather had opened shut on him, and he managed to feel his way around to the handle to open it. During that time, the seaman panicked and knocked his rescuer's mask off, but Teather managed to pin the man against the wall of the galley, put the man's goggles and rebreather back on, get the man to the surface where the other diver took over. Teather then retrieved the other survivor.

While at the surface, Teather strongly suggested that he go back down to the vessel with a bucket filled with air, put the dog's head in the bucket, and assist the dog in reaching the surface. Senior officials frowned upon the idea, stating the dog's life is not worth his own with the possibility of being trapped in the vessel. Consequently, he was relieved to find the next day when the ship was towed to shore and up onto the dock, the dog somehow managed to stay alive and came out of the ship.

Had Teather not undertaken the rescue, the two fishermen would likely have drowned or succumbed to asphyxiation.

=== Recognition ===
For his efforts, Teather was awarded the Cross of Valour, the highest ranking of the Canadian Bravery Decorations. Currently, there have been only 20 recipients of this award; he was Canada's 13th recipient.

On February 10, 2011, Gail Shea, the Minister of Fisheries and Oceans announced that the nine new vessels in a new class of midshore patrol vessels would be named the Hero-class patrol vessels, and would each be named after a Canadian hero. One of the new vessels has been named CCGS Corporal Teather C.V..

== Author ==
Cpl. Teather was a published author whose works included On Patrol with the Royal Canadian Mounted, Mountie Makers, The Scarlet Tunic, and Encyclopedia of Underwater Investigations; which is now part of the course training standards for police divers.
