= CCGS A. LeBlanc =

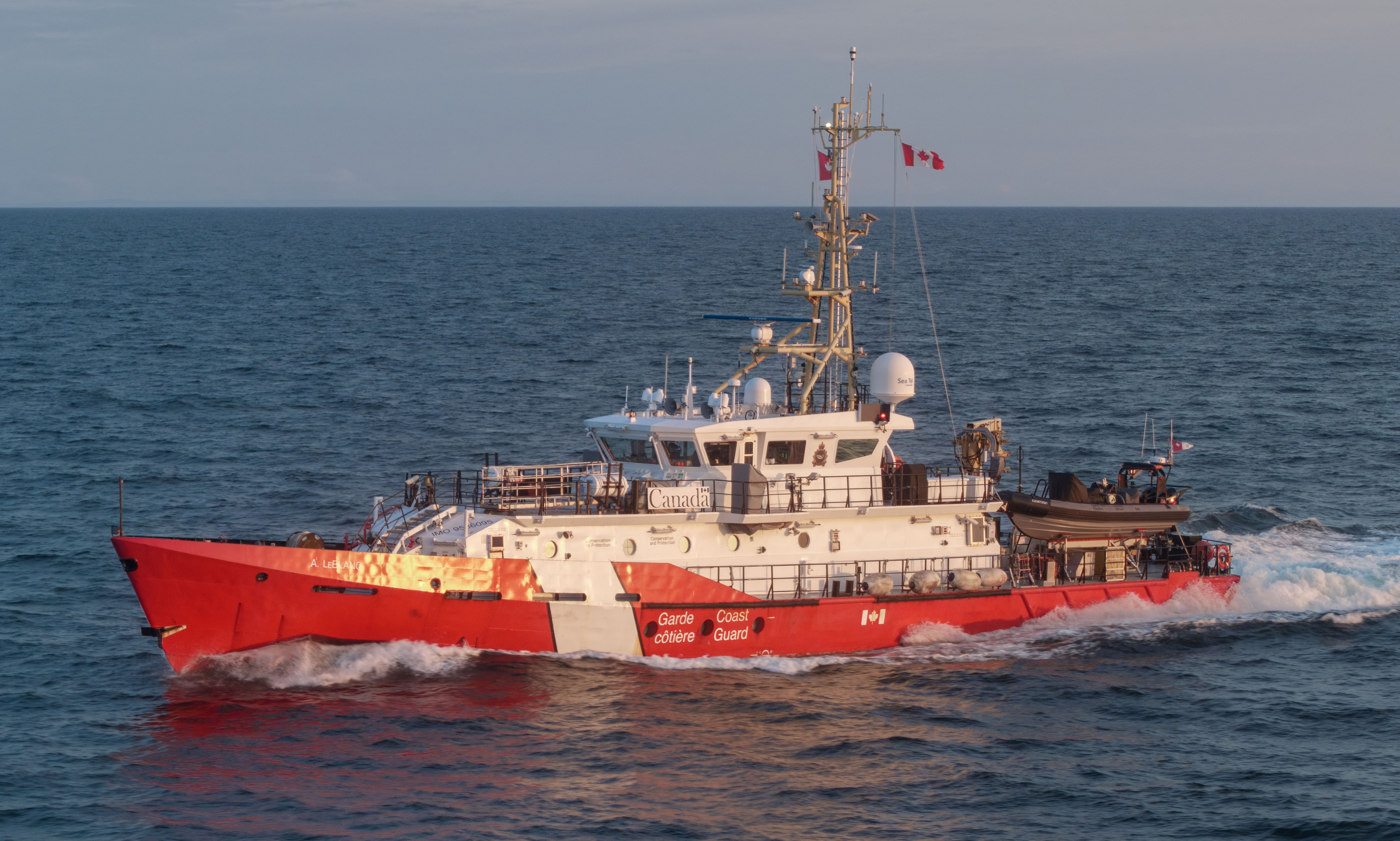
- CCGS A. LeBlanc near Bothwell, Prince Edward Island

History

Canada
- Name: CCGS A LeBlanc
- Namesake: Agapit LeBlanc
- Operator: Canadian Coast Guard
- Builder: Halifax Shipyard, Halifax, Nova Scotia
- Yard number: 6101
- Laid down: 27 October 2012
- Launched: 27 January 2014
- Completed: 5 March 2014
- In service: 20 March 2014
- Home port: CCG IRB Station Quebec
- Identification: IMO number: 9586095
- Status: In active service

General characteristics
- Class & type: Hero-class patrol vessel
- Tonnage: 253 GT; 75 NT
- Length: 42.8 m (140 ft 5 in)
- Beam: 7.0 m (23 ft 0 in)
- Draught: 2.8 m (9 ft 2 in)
- Propulsion: 2 × MTU 4000M geared diesel engines; 2 × controllable pitch propellers, 4,992 kW (6,694 hp)
- Speed: 25 knots (46 km/h; 29 mph)
- Range: 2,000 nmi (3,700 km; 2,300 mi) at 14 kn (26 km/h; 16 mph)
- Endurance: 2 weeks
- Capacity: 5
- Complement: 9
- Sensors & processing systems: Sperry Marine Visionmaster FT (X and S-bands)

CCGS A. LeBlanc is the seventh of nine Hero-class patrol vessels operated by the Canadian Coast Guard. The ship entered service in 2014 and is based at Quebec City, Quebec. A. LeBlanc is tasked with enforcing Canadian maritime law within Canada's maritime borders.

== Description ==
Based on Damen Stan's Patrol 4207 design, the ship measures 42.8 metres (140 ft 5 in) long overall with a beam of 7.0 metres (23 ft 0 in) and a draught of 2.8 metres (9 ft 2 in). The ship has a 253 gross tonnage (GT) and a 75 net tonnage (NT). The ship is propelled by two controllable pitch propellers driven by two MTU 4000M geared diesel engines rated at 4,992 kW (6,694 hp). The patrol vessel is also equipped with two Northern Lights M1066 generators and one Northern Lights M1064 emergency generator. The vessel has a maximum speed of 25 knots (46 km/h; 29 mph). A. LeBlanc has a fuel capacity of 34 m^{3} (7,500 imp gal) giving the vessel a range of 2,000 nautical miles (3,700 km; 2,300 mi) at 14 knots (26 km/h; 16 mph) and an endurance of 14 days. The ship has a complement of nine with five officers and four crew and has five additional berths. The ship is equipped with Sperry Marine Visionmaster FT navigational radar operating on the X and S-bands.

== Service history ==
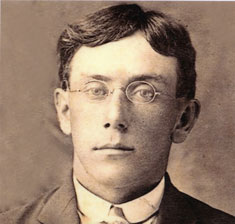
The vessel's namesake, Agipit LeBlanc, was a fishery control officer who was murdered in the line of duty

A. LeBlanc was ordered from Irving Shipbuilding in 2009 and the ship's keel was laid down on 27 October 2012 at Halifax Shipyards in Halifax, Nova Scotia with the yard number 6101. The ship was launched on 27 January 2014 and named for Agipit LeBlanc, a fishery control officer who was murdered in the line of duty. The ship was completed on 5 March 2014 and was accepted, following sea trials, on 20 March 2014.

A. LeBlanc is based at Quebec City, Quebec and is registered in Ottawa, Ontario.

== Sources ==
- "A.LeBlanc (9586095)". Miramar Ship Index.
