= CCGS Corporal Teather C.V. =

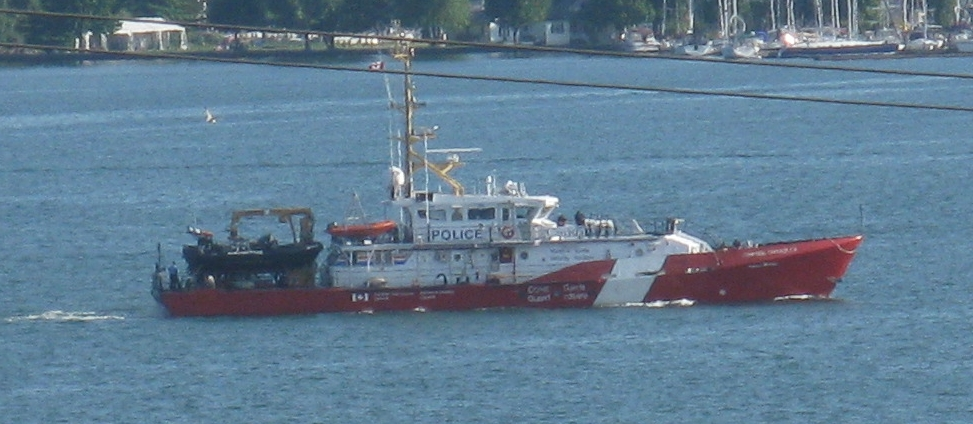
- CCGS Corporal Teather C.V. in Toronto

History

Canada
- Name: CCGS Corporal Teather C.V.
- Namesake: Robert Gordon Teather
- Operator: Canadian Coast Guard
- Builder: Halifax Shipyard, Halifax, Nova Scotia
- Yard number: 6096
- Launched: 15 December 2012
- Completed: February 2013
- Commissioned: 2013
- Home port: CCGS Base Dartmouth, Dartmouth, Nova Scotia
- Identification: IMO number: 9586057
- Status: In active service

General characteristics
- Class & type: Hero-class patrol vessel
- Tonnage: 253 GT; 75 NT
- Length: 42.8 m (140 ft 5 in)
- Beam: 7.0 m (23 ft 0 in)
- Draught: 2.8 m (9 ft 2 in)
- Propulsion: 2 × MTU 4000M geared diesel engines; 2 × controllable pitch propellers, 4,992 kW (6,694 hp)
- Speed: 25 knots (46 km/h; 29 mph)
- Range: 2,000 nmi (3,700 km; 2,300 mi) at 14 kn (26 km/h; 16 mph)
- Endurance: 2 weeks
- Boats & landing craft carried: 1
- Capacity: 5
- Complement: 9
- Sensors & processing systems: Sperry Marine Visionmaster FT (X and S-bands)

CCGS Corporal Teather C.V. is the third of nine of the Canadian Coast Guard's Hero-class patrol vessels. Constructed in 2013, the ship entered service the same year. Corporal Teather C.V. is based at Dartmouth, Nova Scotia, tasked with fisheries patrol and enforcement.

== Description ==
Based on Damen Stan's Patrol 4207 design, the ship measures 42.8 metres (140 ft 5 in) long overall with a beam of 7.0 metres (23 ft 0 in) and a draught of 2.8 metres (9 ft 2 in). The ship has a 253 gross tonnage (GT) and a 75 net tonnage (NT). The ship is propelled by two controllable pitch propellers driven by two MTU 4000M geared diesel engines rated at 4,992 kilowatts (6,694 hp). The patrol vessel is also equipped with two Northern Lights M1066 generators and one Northern Lights M1064 emergency generator. The vessel has a maximum speed of 25 knots (46 km/h; 29 mph). Corporal Teather C.V. has a fuel capacity of 34 m^{3} (7,500 imp gal) giving the vessel a range of 2,000 nautical miles (3,700 km; 2,300 mi) at 14 knots (26 km/h; 16 mph) and an endurance of 14 days. The ship has a complement of nine with five officers and four crew and has five additional berths. The ship is equipped with Sperry Marine Visionmaster FT navigational radar operating on the X and S-bands.

== Service history ==
The ship was ordered from Irving Shipbuilding in 2009 and the ship's keel was laid down at Halifax Shipyards in Halifax, Nova Scotia with the yard number 6096. Launched in 2013, the ship was completed in February of that year and entered service with the Canadian Coast Guard. The ship was named for Robert Gordon Teather, a Royal Canadian Mounted Police corporal who was awarded the Cross of Valour for his actions during a water rescue in 1981. In February 2017, Corporal Teather C.V. was among the Canadian Coast Guard ships named in a report claiming poisoned water aboard some vessels.

== Sources ==
- "Corporal Teather CV (9586057)". Miramar Ship Index.
