= CCGS Private Robertson V.C. =

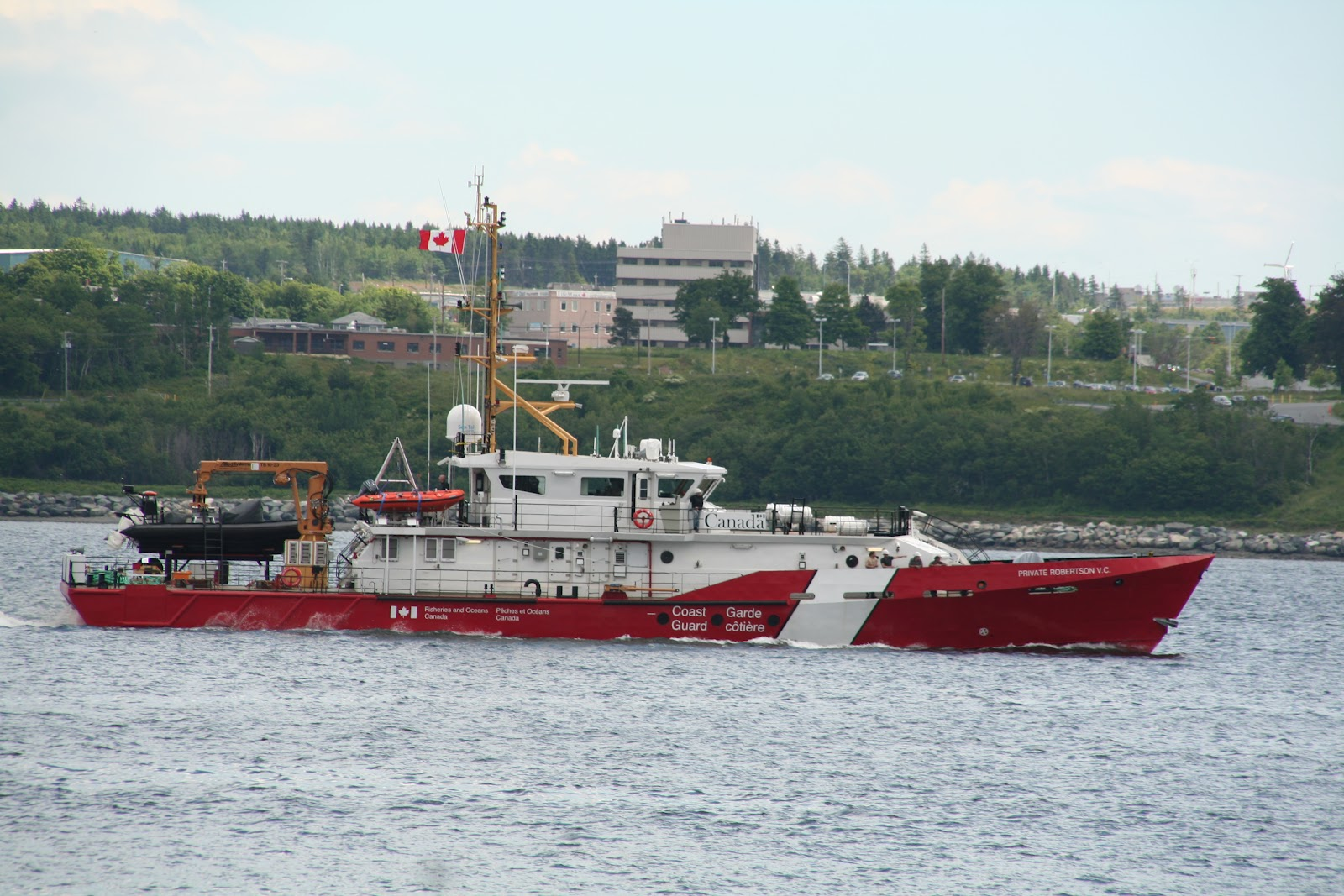
- CCGS Private Robertson V.C. in 2012

History

Canada
- Name: CCGS Private Robertson V.C.
- Namesake: James Peter Robertson
- Operator: Canadian Coast Guard
- Builder: Halifax Shipyard, Halifax, Nova Scotia
- Launched: 12 May 2012
- Completed: July 2012
- Commissioned: 2012
- Home port: CCG Base at Bedford Institute of Oceanography at Halifax Harbour, Dartmouth, Nova Scotia
- Identification: IMO number: 9586033; Call sign: CGJR; MMSI number: 316021592
- Status: In active service

General characteristics
- Class & type: Hero-class patrol vessel
- Tonnage: 253 GT; 75 NT
- Length: 42.8 m (140 ft 5 in)
- Beam: 7 m (23 ft 0 in)
- Draught: 2.8 m (9 ft 2 in)
- Propulsion: 2 × MTU 4000M geared diesel engines; 2 × controllable pitch propellers, 4,992 kW (6,694 hp)
- Speed: 25 knots (46 km/h; 29 mph)
- Range: 2,000 nmi (3,700 km; 2,300 mi) at 14 kn (26 km/h; 16 mph)
- Endurance: 2 weeks
- Complement: 9
- Sensors & processing systems: Sperry Marine Visionmaster FT (X and S-bands)

CCGS Private Robertson V.C. is the first vessel of the Canadian Coast Guard's Hero-class patrol vessels. The ship entered service in 2012, tasked with enforcing Canadian maritime law within Canada's nautical borders. The ship is in active service and is based at the Bedford Institute of Oceanography in Dartmouth, Nova Scotia. It was previously based at CCG Patricia Bay in Sidney, British Columbia.

== Description ==
Based on Damen Stan's Patrol 4207 design, the ship measures 42.8 metres (140 ft 5 in) long overall with a beam of 7.0 metres (23 ft 0 in) and a draught of 2.8 metres (9 ft 2 in). The ship has a 253 gross tonnage (GT) and a 75 net tonnage (NT). The ship is propelled by two controllable pitch propellers driven by two MTU 4000M geared diesel engines rated at 4,992 kilowatts (6,694 hp). The patrol vessel is also equipped with two Northern Lights M1066 generators and one Northern Lights M1064 emergency generator. The vessel has a maximum speed of 25 knots (46 km/h; 29 mph). Private Robertson V.C. has a fuel capacity of 34 m^{3} (7,500 imp gal) giving the vessel a range of 2,000 nautical miles (3,700 km; 2,300 mi) at 14 knots (26 km/h; 16 mph) and an endurance of 14 days. The ship has a complement of nine with five officers and four crew and has five additional berths. The ship is equipped with Sperry Marine Visionmaster FT navigational radar operating on the X and S-bands.

== Service history ==
The ship was ordered from Irving Shipbuilding in 2009 and the ship's keel was laid down at Halifax Shipyards in Halifax, Nova Scotia with the yard number 6094. The ship was launched in 2012 and completed in July of that year, the first of the class. Private Robertson V.C. entered service in 2013 and is based at Sarnia, Ontario. The vessel is named after James Peter Robertson, a winner of the Victoria Cross in the First World War.

On 10 February 2011 the London Free Press reported that Private Robertson V.C., and her sister ship CCGS Caporal Kaeble V.C. will patrol the Great Lakes. Private Robertson V.C. was based at Sarnia, Ontario. In February 2017, Private Robertson V.C. was among the Canadian Coast Guard ships named in a report claiming poisoned water aboard some vessels. In October 2019, Private Robertson V.C. was re-assigned to the West Coast of Canada to allow the vessels stationed there to undergo refits, sailing via the Panama Canal.

== Sources ==
- "Private Robertson VC (9586033)". Miramar Ship Index.
