= James Peter Robertson =

Canadian Victoria Cross recipient (1883-1917)

James Peter Robertson VC
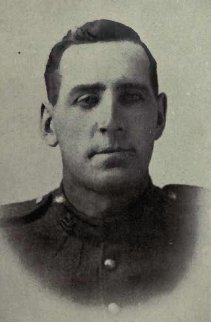
- James Peter Robertson VC
- Born: 26 October 1883; Albion Mines, Nova Scotia
- Died: 6 November 1917 (aged 34); Passchendaele salient, Belgium
- Burial place: Tyne Cot Cemetery, Passchendaele
- Military career
- Allegiance: Canada
- Branch: Canadian Expeditionary Force
- Service years: 1915 - 1917
- Rank: Private
- Unit: 27th (City of Winnipeg) Battalion
- Conflicts: World War I: Western Front; Battle of Passchendaele; Second Battle of Passchendaele †
- Awards: Victoria Cross

James Peter Robertson VC (26 October 1883 – 6 November 1917) was a Canadian recipient of the Victoria Cross, the highest and most prestigious award for valour in the face of the enemy that can be awarded to British and Commonwealth forces.

== Details ==
Born in Albion Mines (now called Stellarton), Pictou County, Nova Scotia, "Pete", as he was known, lived most of his life in Medicine Hat with his mother.

Robertson enlisted in the Canadian Expeditionary Force in June 1915. He became a private in the 27th (City of Winnipeg) Battalion, Canadian Expeditionary Force. Robertson was 34 years old, during the Second Battle of Passchendaele when he performed the following deed for which he was awarded the VC.

"For most conspicuous bravery and outstanding devotion to duty in attack. When his platoon was held up by uncut wire and a machine gun causing many casualties, Pte. Robertson dashed to an opening on the flank, rushed the machine gun and, after a desperate struggle with the crew, killed four and then turned the gun on the remainder, who, overcome by the fierceness of his onslaught, were running towards their own lines. His gallant work enabled the platoon to advance. He inflicted many more casualties among the enemy, and then carrying the captured machine gun, he led his platoon to the final objective. He there selected an excellent position and got the gun into action, firing on the retreating enemy who by this time were quite demoralised by the fire brought to bear on them.

During the consolidation, Pte. Robertson’s use of the machine gun kept down the fire of the enemy snipers; his courage cheered and inspired his comrades.

Later, when two of our snipers were badly wounded in front of our trench, he went out and carried one of them in under very severe fire.

He was killed just as he returned with the second man." (London Gazette, no.30471, 11 January 1918)

== Further information ==
Robertson is buried at Tyne Cot Cemetery, Passchendaele, Belgium, located 5 miles north east of Ypres. (Plot LVIII. Row D. Grave 26).

== The medal ==
His medal is now located in the Canadian War Museum.

== Legacy ==
On 10 February 2011, the Department of Fisheries and Oceans announced that the nine new vessels in a new class of midshore patrol vessels would be named Hero-class patrol vessels. One of the new vessels will be named the CCGS Private Robertson V.C..

Robertson Lake near Wood Buffalo National Park is named after him.

A CPR station in Calgary was named Robertson Railway Station when established around 1917. It no longer exists.

== See also ==
- Military history of Nova Scotia
- List of Canadian Victoria Cross recipients
