= J. L. François Carrière =

- Born: 1956
- Died: 1997 (aged 40–41); Cape Breton, Nova Scotia, Canada
- Occupation: Police officer
- Known for: Died in the line of duty

J. L. François Carrière was an officer in the Royal Canadian Mounted Police, who drowned on duty. On February 10, 2011, the Department of Fisheries and Oceans announced that a new vessel was going to be named the CCGS Constable Carrière. The vessel was one of nine vessels in the new Hero-class patrol vessels, all of which will be named after Canadian heroes.

== RCMP career ==
Carrière applied to the RCMP in August 1987 at the age of 33. He was a married man with two young children.

He was stationed in Prince Edward Island for the first four years of his RCMP career. In 1993, Carrière was transferred to the detachment at Cole Harbour, Nova Scotia. While there, Carrière, who had been an amateur scuba diver, applied to be a police diver. While working as a scuba diver with the RCMP Underwater Recovery Team in Cape Breton, searching a suspected drug-smuggling vessel, Carrière died during an underwater inspection.

The Donia Portland was a large freighter, and Carrière was one of a team of five inspecting the vessel. He reported problems with his breathing apparatus, although his gauge showed he still had air in his tanks. Another diver who went to assist him lost contact with him due to murky water. He seems to have been unable to follow a line the divers to which were attached to the surface, because the buoy it was attached to had been dragged underwater.

An investigation attributed his death to flawed procedures and equipment malfunctions, and the RCMP paid a large fine. Dive rules were explicitly changed so every diver was assigned a "buddy", in order to prevent deaths of this kind in future.
