= CCGS Captain Goddard M.S.M. =

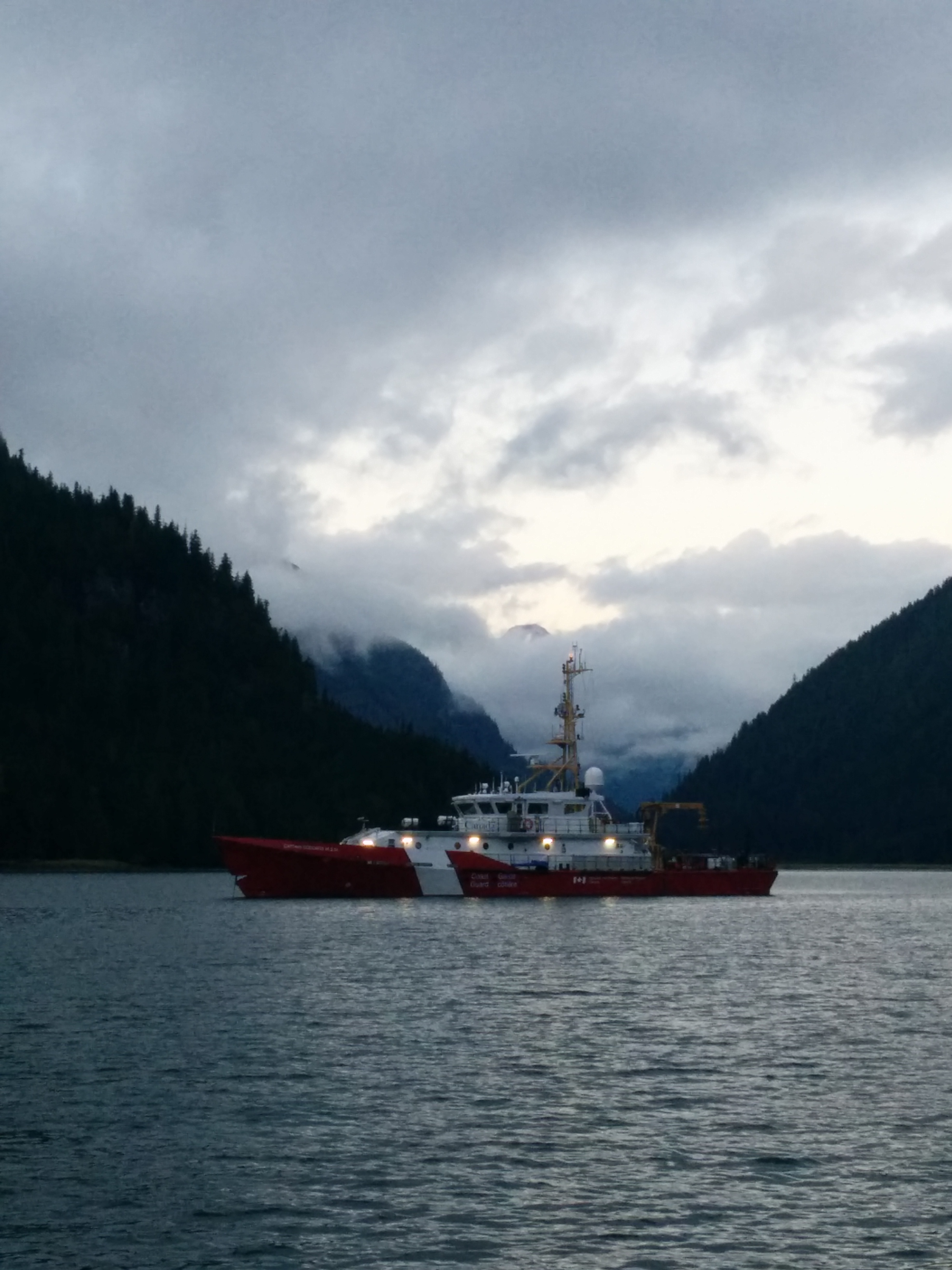
- CCGS Captain Goddard M.S.M. at anchor in Khutzmateen Inlet in 2015

History

Canada
- Name: Captain Goddard M.S.M.
- Namesake: Nichola Goddard
- Operator: Canadian Coast Guard
- Builder: Halifax Shipyard, Halifax, Nova Scotia
- Launched: 21 May 2014
- Sponsored by: Sally Goddard
- Christened: 24 May 2015
- Commissioned: 15 October 2014
- Home port: CCG Base Victoria (James Bay, Greater Victoria)
- Identification: IMO number: 9586112
- Status: In active service

General characteristics
- Class & type: Hero-class patrol vessel
- Tonnage: 253 GT; 75 NT
- Length: 42.8 m (140 ft 5 in)
- Beam: 7.0 m (23 ft 0 in)
- Draught: 2.8 m (9 ft 2 in)
- Propulsion: 2 × MTU 4000M geared diesel engines; 2 × controllable pitch propellers, 4,992 kW (6,694 hp)
- Speed: 25 knots (46 km/h; 29 mph)
- Range: 2,000 nmi (3,700 km; 2,300 mi) at 14 kn (26 km/h; 16 mph)
- Endurance: 2 weeks
- Capacity: 5
- Complement: 9
- Sensors & processing systems: Sperry Marine Visionmaster FT (X and S-bands)

CCGS Captain Goddard M.S.M. is one of the Canadian Coast Guard's nine Hero-class patrol vessels. The ship entered service in 2014 and is based at Victoria, British Columbia on Canada's West Coast. The vessel's primary roles will be fishery and environmental patrols, border control, search and rescue.

== Description ==
Based on Damen Stan's Patrol 4207 design, the ship measures 42.8 metres (140 ft 5 in) long overall with a beam of 7.0 metres (23 ft 0 in) and a draught of 2.8 metres (9 ft 2 in). The ship has a 253 gross tonnage (GT) and a 75 net tonnage (NT). The ship is propelled by two controllable pitch propellers driven by two MTU 4000M geared diesel engines rated at 4,992 kilowatts (6,694 hp). The patrol vessel is also equipped with two Northern Lights M1066 generators and one Northern Lights M1064 emergency generator. The vessel has a maximum speed of 25 knots (46 km/h; 29 mph). Captain Goddard M.S.M. has a fuel capacity of 34 m^{3} (7,500 imp gal) giving the vessel a range of 2,000 nautical miles (3,700 km; 2,300 mi) at 14 knots (26 km/h; 16 mph) and an endurance of 14 days. The ship has a complement of nine with five officers and four crew and has five additional berths. The ship is equipped with Sperry Marine Visionmaster FT navigational radar operating on the X and S-bands.

== Service history ==
Captain Goddard M.S.M. was ordered from Irving Shipbuilding in 2009 and the ship's keel was laid down on 20 March 2013 at Halifax Shipyards in Halifax, Nova Scotia with the yard number 6103. The vessel was launched on 17 May 2014 and named for Captain Nichola Goddard, a soldier who died in combat in 2006. The ship was sponsored by Captain Goddard's mother, Sally Goddard. The ship was completed on 8 October 2014.

Following acceptance by the Canadian Coast Guard on 15 October 2014, Captain Goddard M.S.M. was the last of the Hero-class patrol vessels to enter service. Following acceptance trials, the ship returned to Dartmouth, Nova Scotia before travelling to British Columbia.

== Sources ==
- "Captain Goddard M.S.M. (9586112)". Miramar Ship Index.
