= Joseph Kaeble =

Recipient of the Victoria Cross

Joseph-Thomas Keable VC, MM
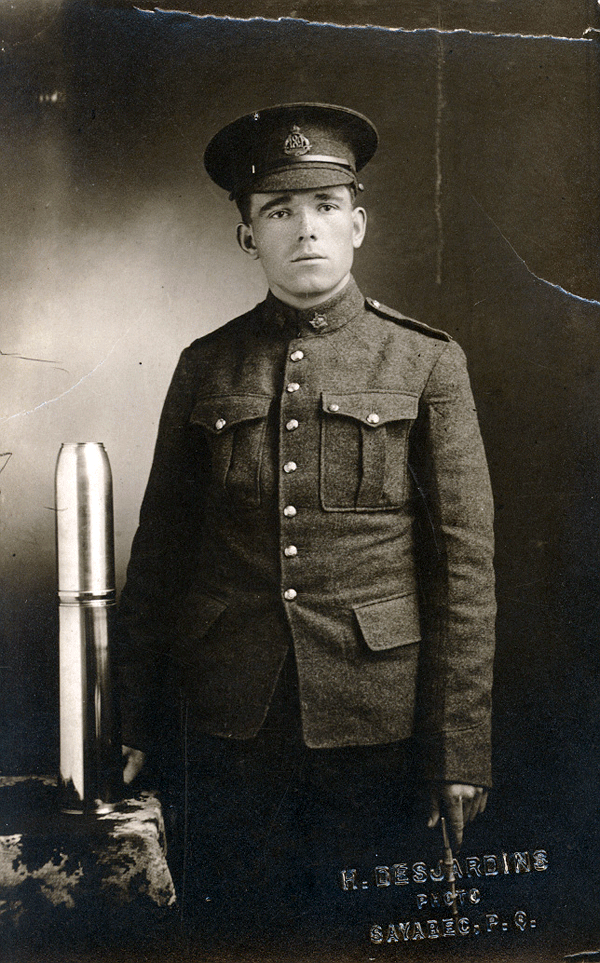
- Born: 5 May 1892; Saint-Moïse, Quebec, Canada
- Died: 9 June 1918 (aged 26); Neuville-Vitasse, France
- Burial place: Wanquetin Communal Cemetery Extension, France
- Military career
- Allegiance: Canada
- Branch: Canadian Expeditionary Force
- Service years: 1916–1918
- Rank: Corporal
- Unit: 22nd Battalion (French Canadian), CEF
- Conflicts: World War I †
- Awards: Victoria Cross; Military Medal

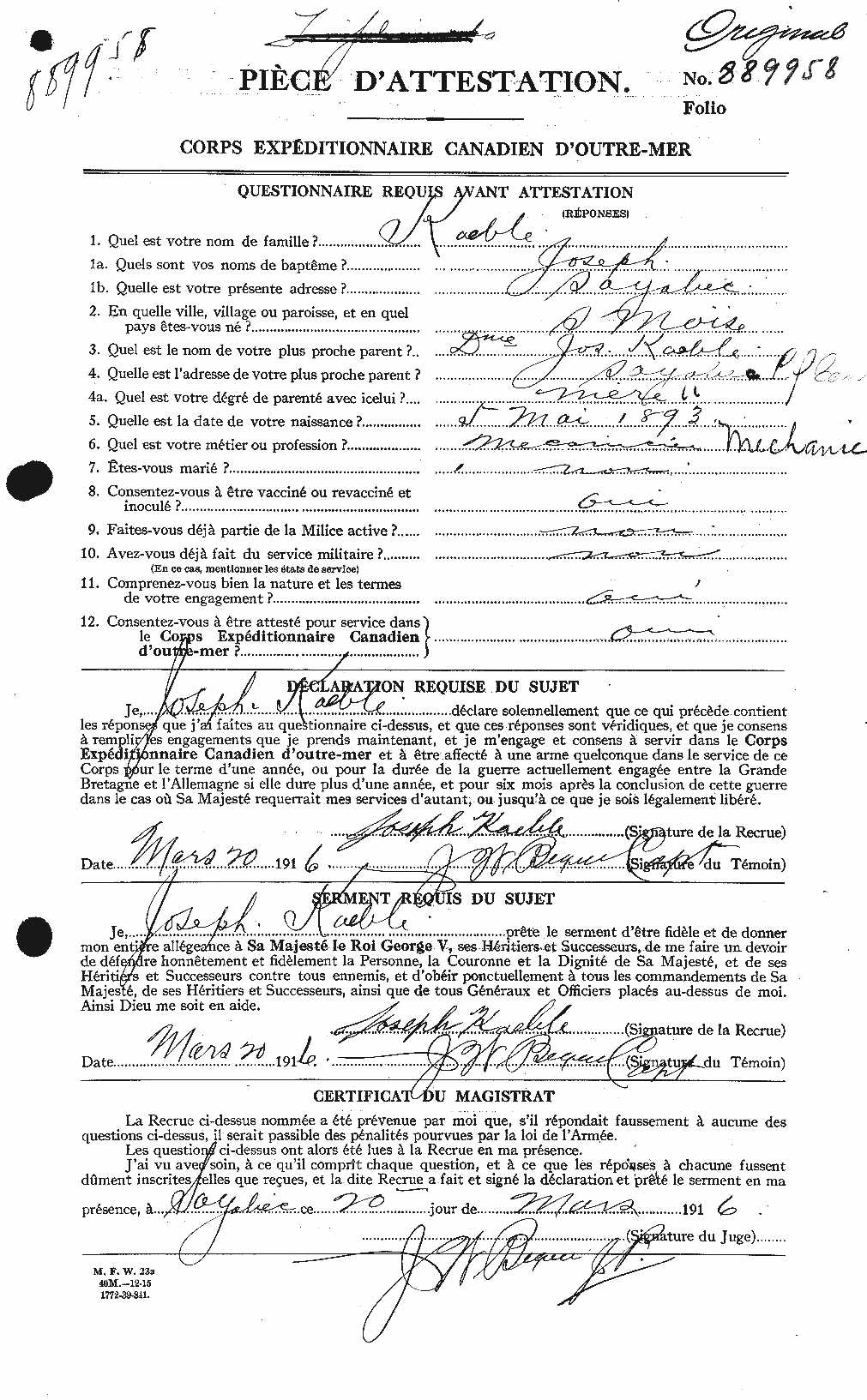
Joseph Keable's Canadian Expeditionary Force Enlistment Document dated 20 March 1916

Joseph Thomas Keable, VC, MM (5 May 1892 – 9 June 1918) was a Canadian soldier during the First World War. Keable was a recipient of the Victoria Cross, the highest and most prestigious award for gallantry in the face of the enemy that can be awarded to British and Commonwealth forces. He was the first French Canadian soldier to be decorated with the VC and Military Medal.

Mostly wrongly spelled Kaeble in English, his actual name at baptism was Keable. His name is also oddly spelled Kable in a page of the 1911 Census of Canada.

== Biography ==
Born in Saint-Moïse, east of Mont-Joli, Joseph Kaeble lived in the Gaspé until the age of 22. He had a brother, a sister, and a half-brother. His father died when he was still a child, and the family then settled in Sayabec, a village at the head of Lac Matapédia. There Kaeble attended the school run by the Frères de la Croix de Jésus, where he was remembered as a serious and energetic student. Later he worked as a mechanic at a local sawmill.

On March 20, 1916, Kaeble volunteered in the 189th Infantry Battalion and trained at Valcartier for six months before being sent to England on September 27. In England Kaeble was transferred to the 69th Infantry Battalion, which would be incorporated into the 22nd Infantry Battalion. Kaeble had the rank of private and was part of a machine gun team.

Kaeble took part in the Battle of Vimy Ridge on April 9, 1917 and twelve days after the battle he was wounded in the right shoulder and sent to No.13 General Hospital and then at No.1 Convalescent Depot. Kaeble spent twenty-five days in hospital before returning to his unit on May 27, 1917 and take part in the battles of Hill 70 and Passchendaele. In March 1918 the 22nd was in the Mercatel sector and on April 23 Kaeble was promoted to corporal.

The actions that would result in Joseph Kaeble receiving the Victoria Cross occurred on June 8, 1918. The following extract is recorded in the London Gazette Supplement No. 30903, dated September 16, 1918:

"For most conspicuous bravery and extraordinary devotion to duty when in charge of a Lewis gun section in the front line trenches, on which a strong enemy raid was attempted.

During an intense enemy bombardment Cpl. Kaeble remained at the parapet with his Lewis gun shouldered ready for action, the field of fire being very short. As soon as the barrage lifted from the front line, about fifty of the enemy advanced towards his post. By this time the whole of his section except one had become casualties. Cpl. Kaeble jumped over the parapet, and holding his Lewis gun at the hip, emptied one magazine after another into the advancing enemy, and, although wounded several times by fragments of shells and bombs, he continued to fire, and entirely blocked the enemy by his determined stand. Finally, firing all the time, he fell backwards into the trench, mortally wounded. While lying on his back in the trench he fired his last cartridges over the parapet at the retreating Germans, and before losing consciousness shouted to the wounded about him: 'Keep it up boys; do not let them get through! We must stop them!" The complete repulse of the enemy attack at this point was due to the remarkable personal bravery and self-sacrifice of this gallant non-commissioned officer, who died of his wounds shortly afterwards."

Burial and Legacy

Kaeble was buried in the CWGC extension of Wanquetin Communal Cemetery- Plot II, Row A, Grave 8 - which is found about eleven kilometres (seven miles) west of Arras.

At CFB Valcartier, honours to Keable include Mount Keable, just east of Camp Vimy; a street on the base; and the Keable Club, the privates' and corporals' mess.

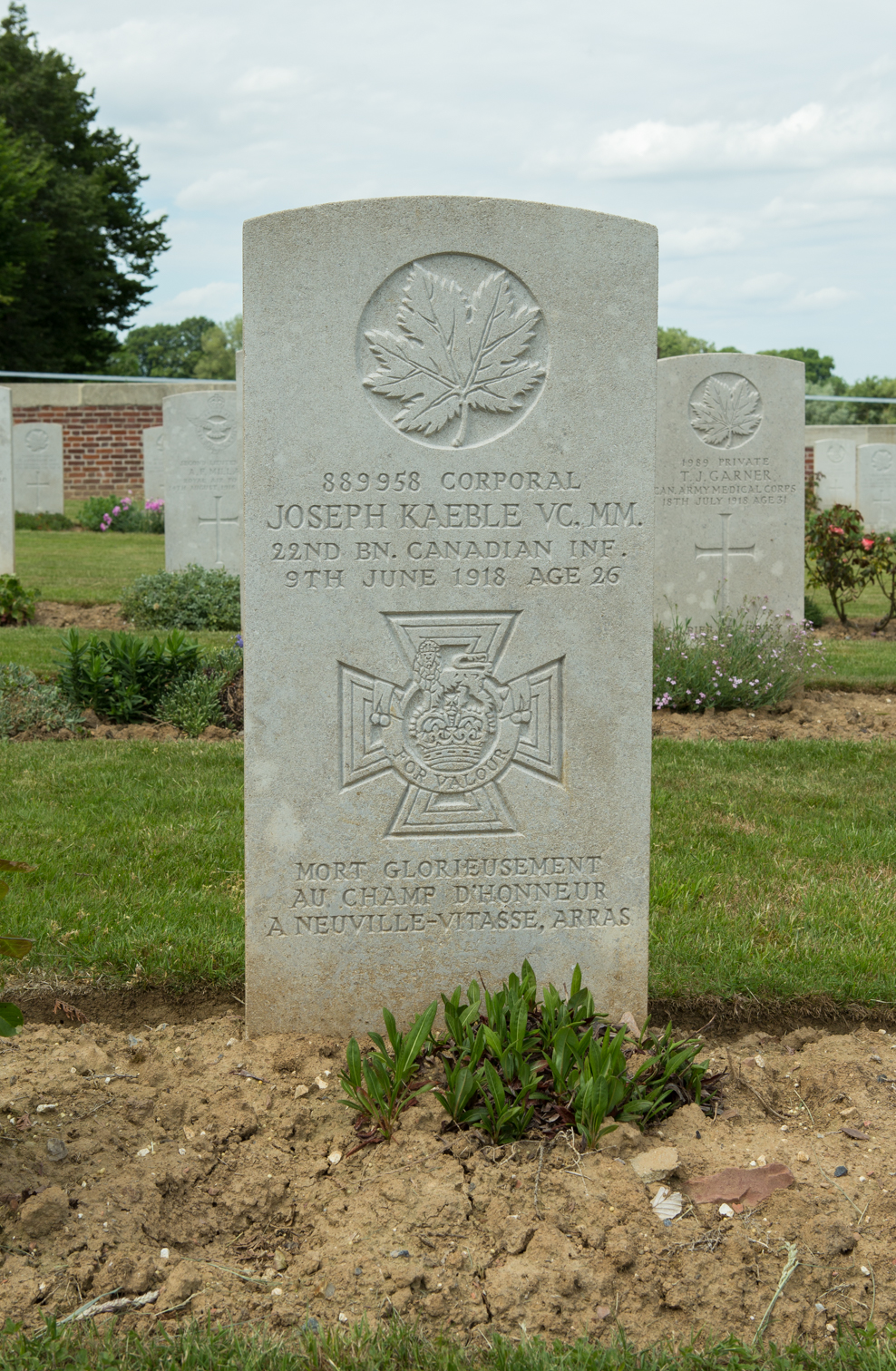
Keable's CWGC gravestone

On 10 February 2011, the Canadian Government announced the commissioning of a new Hero Class of mid-shore patrol vessels to serve in the Canadian Coast Guard. The nine ships of the class would bear the names of Canadian Forces, RCMP, Coast Guard and Department of Fisheries and Oceans personnel who had performed exceptional, heroic acts.
The second vessel was named CCGS Caporal Keable V.C. in his honour, and was presented to the Coast Guard on 13 November 2012.
