= CCGS Caporal Kaeble V.C. =

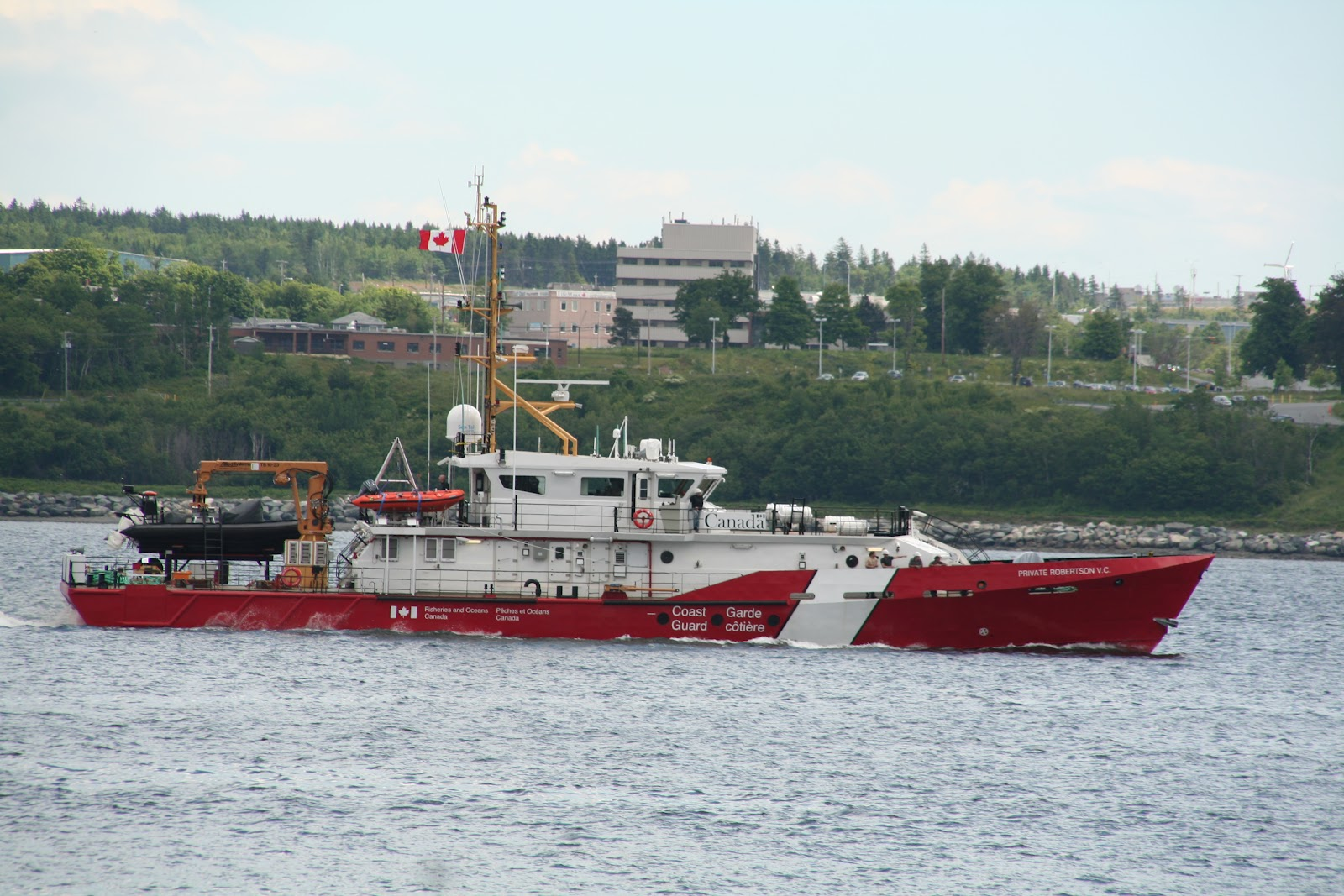
- CCGS Private Robertson V.C., a sister ship

History

Canada
- Name: CCGS Caporal Kaeble V.C.
- Namesake: Joseph Kaeble
- Operator: Canadian Coast Guard
- Builder: Halifax Shipyard, Halifax, Nova Scotia
- Launched: 22 September 2012
- Completed: November 2012
- Commissioned: 2013
- Home port: CCG IRB Station Quebec
- Identification: IMO number: 9586045; MMSI number: 316021593; Callsign: CGJP
- Status: In active service

General characteristics
- Class & type: Hero-class patrol vessel
- Tonnage: 253 GT; 75 NT
- Length: 42.8 m (140 ft 5 in)
- Beam: 7.0 m (23 ft 0 in)
- Draught: 2.8 m (9 ft 2 in)
- Propulsion: 2 × MTU 4000M geared diesel engines; 2 × controllable pitch propellers, 4,992 kW (6,694 hp)
- Speed: 25 knots (46 km/h; 29 mph)
- Range: 2,000 nmi (3,700 km; 2,300 mi) at 14 kn (26 km/h; 16 mph)
- Endurance: 2 weeks
- Capacity: 5
- Complement: 9
- Sensors & processing systems: Sperry Marine Visionmaster FT (X and S-bands)

CCGS Caporal Kaeble V.C. is the second of nine Hero-class patrol vessels to be delivered to the Canadian Coast Guard. Entering service in 2013, the vessel is based at Quebec City and tasked with enforcing Canadian maritime law within Canada's borders.

== Description ==
Based on Damen Stan's Patrol 4207 design, the ship measures 42.8 metres (140 ft 5 in) long overall with a beam of 7.0 metres (23 ft 0 in) and a draught of 2.8 metres (9 ft 2 in). The ship has a 253 gross tonnage (GT) and a 75 net tonnage (NT). The ship is propelled by two controllable pitch propellers driven by two MTU 4000M geared diesel engines rated at 4,992 kW (6,694 hp). The patrol vessel is also equipped with two Northern Lights M1066 generators and one Northern Lights M1064 emergency generator. The vessel has a maximum speed of 25 knots (46 km/h; 29 mph). Caporal Kaeble V.C. has a fuel capacity of 34 m^{3} (7,500 imp gal) giving the vessel a range of 2,000 nautical miles (3,700 km; 2,300 mi) at 14 knots (26 km/h; 16 mph) and an endurance of 14 days. The ship has a complement of nine with five officers and four crew and has five additional berths. The ship is equipped with Sperry Marine Visionmaster FT navigational radar operating on the X and S-bands.

== Service history ==
The ship was ordered from Irving Shipbuilding in 2009 and the ship's keel was laid down at Halifax Shipyards in Halifax, Nova Scotia with the yard number 6095. The ship was launched on 22 September 2012, christened by Denis Lebel, the Minister of Infrastructure, Communities and Intergovernmental Affairs and Minister of the Economic Development Agency of Canada for the Regions of Quebec and completed in November of that year. Caporal Kaeble V.C. entered service in 2013 and was based at Quebec City, Quebec. The vessel is named after Joseph Kaeble, a winner of the Victoria Cross in the First World War.

== Sources ==
- "Caporal Kaeble V.C. (9586045)". Miramar Ship Index.
