= CCGS Corporal McLaren M.M.V. =

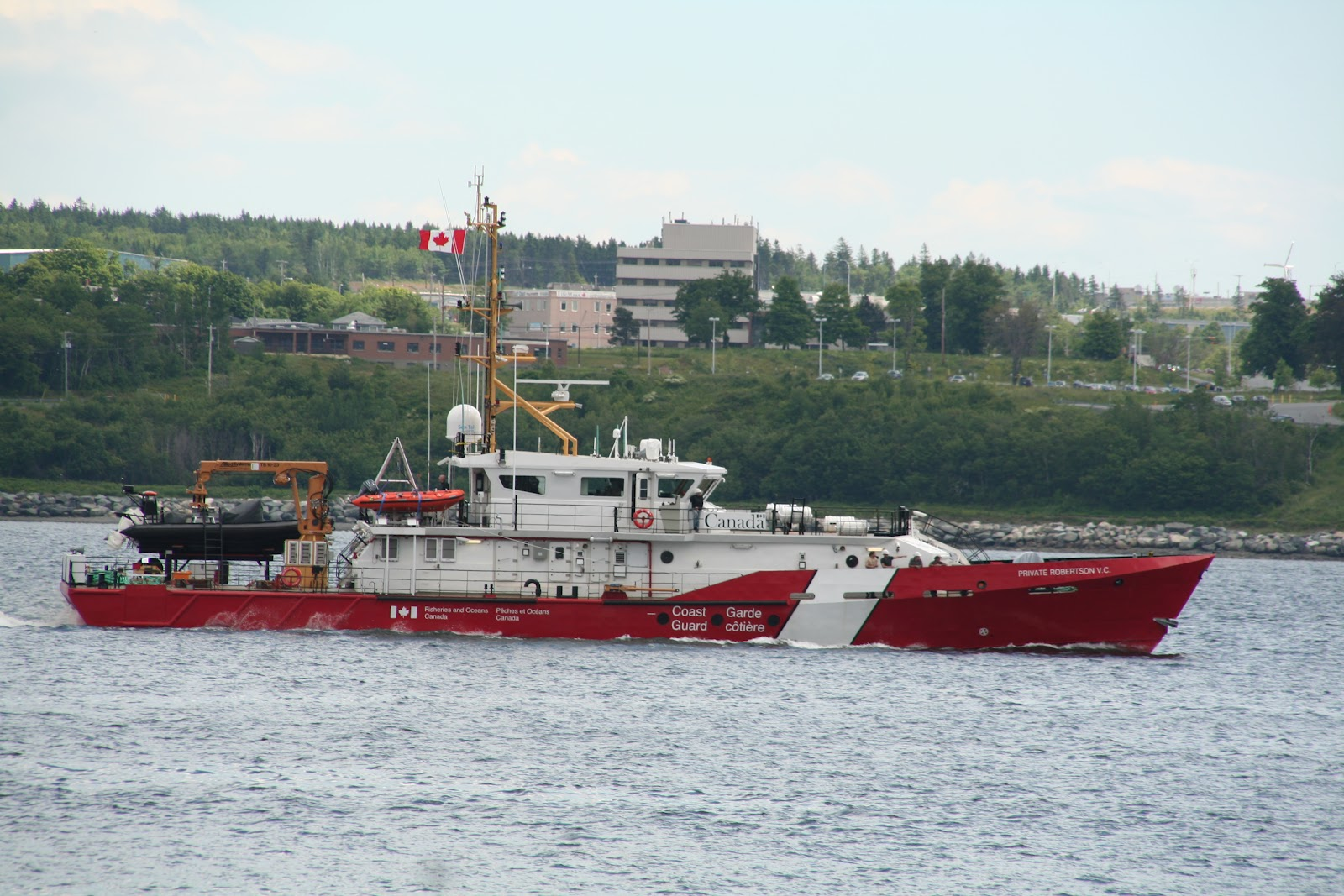
- Sister ship CCGS Private Robertson V.C. in 2012

History

Canada
- Name: CCGS Corporal McLaren M.M.V.
- Operator: Canadian Coast Guard
- Builder: Halifax Shipyard, Halifax, Nova Scotia
- Laid down: 13 July 2012
- Launched: 13 September 2013
- Completed: 26 October 2013
- In service: 2013
- Out of service: 2018
- Identification: IMO number: 9586083
- Fate: Sold for scrap, 2025

General characteristics
- Class & type: Hero-class patrol vessel
- Tonnage: 253 GT; 75 NT
- Length: 42.8 m (140 ft 5 in)
- Beam: 7.0 m (23 ft 0 in)
- Draught: 2.8 m (9 ft 2 in)
- Propulsion: 2 × MTU 4000M geared diesel engines; 2 × controllable pitch propellers, 4,992 kW (6,694 hp)
- Speed: 25 knots (46 km/h; 29 mph)
- Range: 2,000 nmi (3,700 km; 2,300 mi) at 14 kn (26 km/h; 16 mph)
- Endurance: 2 weeks
- Complement: 9
- Sensors & processing systems: Sperry Marine Visionmaster FT (X and S-bands)

CCGS Corporal McLaren M.M.V. is the sixth vessel of the Canadian Coast Guard's Hero-class patrol vessels. The ship entered service in 2013, tasked with enforcing Canadian maritime law within Canada's nautical borders. While undergoing a refit in 2018, the ship was cut loose from its dock and sank, causing significant damage to the vessel. The ship was reported sold for scrap in 2025.

== Description ==
Based on Damen Stan's Patrol 4207 design, the patrol vessel measures 42.8 metres (140 ft 5 in) long overall with a beam of 7 metres (23 ft 0 in) and a draught of 2.8 metres (9 ft 2 in). The ship is constructed of steel and aluminum and has a 253 gross tonnage (GT) and a 75 net tonnage (NT). The ship is propelled by two controllable pitch propellers driven by two MTU 4000M geared diesel engines rated at 4,992 kilowatts (6,694 hp). The patrol vessel is also equipped with two Northern Lights M1066 generators and one Northern Lights M1064 emergency generator. The vessel has a maximum speed of 25 knots (46 km/h; 29 mph). Corporal McLaren M.M.V. has a fuel capacity of 34 m^{3} (7,500 imp gal) giving the vessel a range of 2,000 nautical miles (3,700 km; 2,300 mi) at 14 knots (26 km/h; 16 mph) and an endurance of 14 days. The ship has a complement of nine with five officers and four crew and has five additional berths. The ship is equipped with Sperry Marine Visionmaster FT navigational radar operating on the X and S-bands.

== Construction and career ==
The sixth vessel of the Canadian Coast Guard's Hero class was laid down on 13 July 2012 by Halifax Shipyard at Halifax, Nova Scotia with the yard number 6099. The vessel was named Corporal McLaren M.M.V. for the soldier Mark Robert McLaren of the Canadian Army who was killed in the War in Afghanistan and displayed valour for which he was awarded the Medal of Military Valour. The ship was launched on 13 September 2013. The patrol vessel was completed on 26 October 2013 and entered service that year.

Corporal McLaren M.M.V. is registered in Ottawa, Ontario and based at Dartmouth, Nova Scotia. The patrol vessel is used primarily for enforcing Canadian maritime law within Canada's nautical borders. In May 2016 Corporal McLaren M.M.V. was taken out of service to address corrosion on stern plates.

While undergoing a refit at Sambro, Nova Scotia, on 17 November 2018 Corporal McLaren M.M.V. was released from the vessel's cradle, allegedly due to vandalism. The vessel slid down the slip and lay partially submerged in the water, though the damage was light. The ship was refloated on 26 November 2018 and taken to a dock in Sambro where the full extent of the damage was assessed. In the aftermath, the Canadian Coast Guard cut ties with Canadian Maritime Engineering, the shipyard performing the repair work at the time of the sabotage. The Government of Canada budgeted CAD$11 million for the repair of Corporal McLaren M.M.V. with no timeline on the vessel's return to service. In June 2024 the Government of Canada issued a Request for Proposals to break up the vessel and dispose of it in an environmentally responsible manner. The ship was reported sold in January 2025 to Marine Recycling Corporation for scrapping.
