= CCGS Matthew =

Canadian Coast Guard scientific research and survey vessel

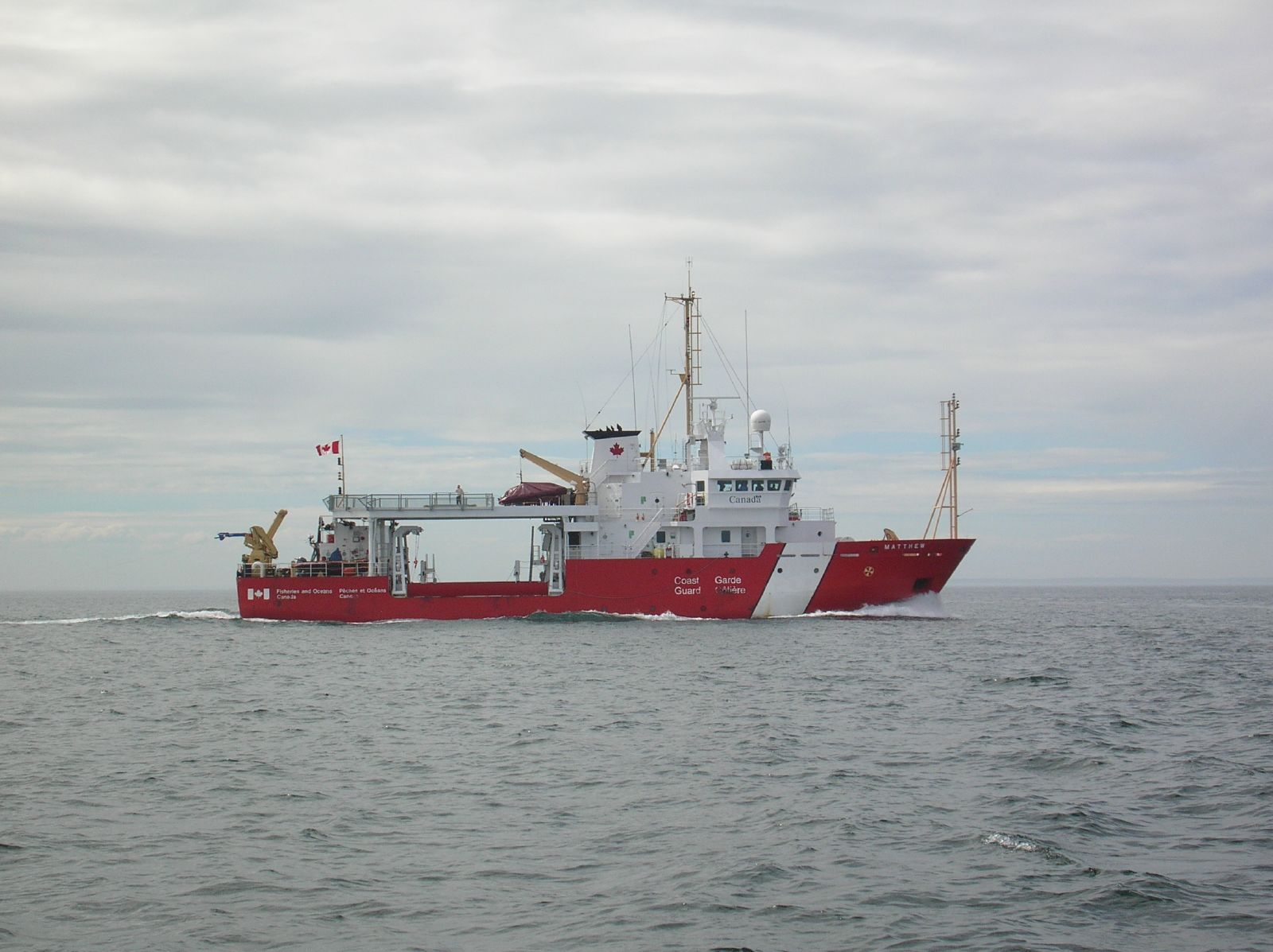
- CCGS Matthew underway

History

Canada
- Name: Matthew
- Namesake: Matthew
- Operator: Fisheries and Oceans Canada; Canadian Coast Guard
- Port of registry: Ottawa, Ontario
- Builder: Versatile Pacific Shipyards Ltd., North Vancouver
- Launched: 29 April 1990
- Completed: September 1990
- Commissioned: 1990
- Decommissioned: 2016
- Refit: 2009–2010
- Home port: CCG Base Dartmouth, Nova Scotia – Maritimes Region
- Identification: IMO number: 8806010
- Status: Decommissioned

General characteristics
- Type: Research vessel
- Tonnage: 856.8 GT; 228 NT
- Length: 50.3 m (165 ft 0 in)
- Beam: 10.5 m (34 ft 5 in)
- Draught: 4.3 m (14 ft 1 in)
- Installed power: 1,350 kW (1,810 hp)
- Propulsion: 2 × Caterpillar 3508 geared diesel engines; 2 × controllable pitch propellers, bow thruster
- Speed: 12 knots (22 km/h; 14 mph)
- Range: 4,000 nmi (7,408 km; 4,603 mi) at 12 knots
- Endurance: 20 days
- Boats & landing craft carried: 4
- Complement: 14
- Sensors & processing systems: Sperry Marine Bridgemaster II (X-band)

CCGS Matthew (Note: CCGS stands for Canadian Coast Guard Ship) was a Canadian Coast Guard mid-shore scientific research and survey vessel, based at Dartmouth, Nova Scotia, that entered service in 1990. The ship operated within the Canadian Coast Guard Maritimes region. Matthew was primarily used to carry out hydrographic survey work primarily for the production of nautical charting products on the East and West Coasts, but could also be used for stock assessment using sonar. In 2016, the ship was taken out of service and put up for sale. In 2019 the vessel was sold and renamed Miss MJ.

== Description ==
Matthew is of steel construction and is 50.3 metres (165 ft 0 in) long with a beam of 10.5 metres (34 ft 5 in) and a draught of 4.3 metres (14 ft 1 in). The ship has 856.8 gross tonnage (GT) and a 228 net tonnage (NT). The ship is powered by two Caterpillar 3508 geared diesel engines rated at 1,350 kilowatts (1,810 hp) driving two controllable pitch propellers and a bow thruster. This gives the ship a maximum speed of 12 knots (22 km/h; 14 mph). The ship has a fuel capacity of 119 m^{3} (26,000 imp gal) giving the ship a range of 4,000 nautical miles (7,400 km; 4,600 mi) at 12 knots and an endurance of 20 days. The ship is also equipped with two Caterpillar 3406 generators and one Caterpillar 3406 emergency generator.

Matthew is equipped with four boats and has one HIAB crane capable of lifting 3.4 t (3.3 long tons; 3.7 short tons). The ship has two laboratories both 10 m^{2} (110 sq ft); one for hydrographic purposes and one for combined hydrographic/drafting purposes. The research vessel is equipped with Sperry Marine Bridgemaster II navigational radar operating on the X-band. The ship has a complement of 14, with 6 officers and 8 crew. Matthew also has six additional berths.

=== Refits ===
During 2005 the vessel was equipped with an advanced, multi-beam echo-sounder. The transducers for this equipment are housed in a centerline pod which extends 1.0 m (3.3 ft) below the keel. Suggested alterations to sonar were met with a lack of enthusiasm. Nonetheless, subsequent missions were able to be conducted with only minor delays, none of which were related to the new sonars.

As a part of Canada's Economic Action Plan in 2009–2010, Matthew underwent a refit in Quebec City costing over $105,000, involving systems replacement, crane replacement, and reliability improvements. In May 2011 Matthew received a short refit. Matthew has minimal ice strengthening in its forward hull, and no strengthening of its rudders, shafting and propellers for operation in ice-covered waters.

== Construction and career ==
Constructed by Versatile Pacific Shipyards Ltd. at their yard in North Vancouver, British Columbia with the yard number 511. Matthew was launched on 29 April 1990 and completed in September 1990. The ship was commissioned that year and named for John Cabot's ship Matthew from his second voyage to North America. The name came from a competition among high school students from Newfoundland and Labrador. The ship was based at the Bedford Institute of Oceanography in Nova Scotia and registered in Ottawa, Ontario.

In 1998, Matthew was among the Canadian Coast Guard vessels assigned to the search for Swissair Flight 111, mapping the wreckage off the coast of Nova Scotia. The ship participated in the mapping of Placentia Bay, Newfoundland, in co-operation with Natural Resources Canada and the Canadian Hydrographic Service in April 2004. The vessel was used for mapping the coastal sea floor and harbour entries, which allowed smaller craft to keep closer the shoreline rather than sail out in the heavier seas. The vessel spent much of its time updating nautical charts that had not been reviewed since the time of Captain James Cook. Matthew was also detailed to investigate sinkholes in Bras d’Or Lake of Cape Breton Island. Matthew was decommissioned in 2016, renamed 2015-03 and was put up for auction. The former Coast Guard vessel was taken out of service due to a change in the way coastal mapping was to be performed by the government, with a switch towards "coastal parties, ship-based surveys and airborne hydrography." The ship was put up for auction five times, receiving no bids. In 2019, the ship was sold to a numbered company in Newfoundland and Labrador and renamed Miss M.J. or Miss MJ. The vessel was towed to Sydney, Nova Scotia for a refit before further sale.

== Sources ==
- Maginley, Charles D. (2003). The Canadian Coast Guard 1962–2002. St. Catharines, Ontario: Vanwell Publishing Limited. ISBN 1-55125-075-6.
- Maginley, Charles D. & Collin, Bernard (2001). The Ships of Canada's Marine Services. St. Catharines, Ontario: Vanwell Publishing Limited. ISBN 1-55125-070-5.
- "Matthew (8806010)". Miramar Ship Index.
