= Valerie Fortney =

Canadian journalist

Valerie Fortney is a Canadian journalist born in Winnipeg, Manitoba. She has a successful career in broadcasting, magazines, and newspapers. Fortney was a regular contributor in the 1990s to the popular CBC Radio show Basic Black, and served as a frequent commentator for CBC Newsworld. Her feature writing has appeared across North America and around the world, in publications such as Chatelaine, the Los Angeles Times and Reader’s Digest International. In the 1990s, she was the founding editor of Avenue magazine, a Calgary magazine named Best New Magazine at the 1997 National Magazine Awards. The magazine won several other regional and national awards during her tenure. A columnist and feature writer at the Calgary Herald since 1998. Valerie has been nominated twice for National Newspaper Awards: in 2001, for Spot Reporting for her feature work on the 9/11 terrorist attacks; and in 2005, for Investigations for her work on a special series focusing on India's abandoned brides, titled Abandoned Brides: Canada's Shame, India's Sorrow. The series went on to win the Daniel Pearl award for print journalism, beating out The New York Times and Chicago Tribune; the UK-based Commonwealth Writers' Union Words and Pictures award; and the B.C.-based Webster award for best news reporting.

== Sunray ==
Fortney's first book, Sunray the Death and Life of Captain Nichola Goddard was published by Key Porter Books in 2010. The book profiles the life of Forward Observation Officer Captain Nichola Goddard, who earned a place in Canadian history on May 17, 2006 when she became the first female Canadian soldier to die in combat, but beyond that who consistently pushed the limits imposed on the female sex. Quill & Quire reviewed the book saying, "Eschewing tragic, one-note platitudes, the book honours a fearless young woman who grew into a resilient warrior … The detail and research Fortney marshals renders the story universal, and reveals the difficult compromises that military life demands. This is not a book only for military enthusiasts or history buffs; it will reward any reader interested in the drama of a brave, inspiring life." Sunray the Death and Life of Captain Nichola Goddard was longlisted for the British Columbia National Award for Canadian Non-Fiction.
