= Nichola Goddard =

Canadian soldier

- Captain Nichola Kathleen Sarah Goddard
- Born: May 2, 1980; Madang, Papua New Guinea
- Died: May 17, 2006 (aged 26); Panjwaye District, Kandahar Province, Afghanistan

Captain Nichola Kathleen Sarah Goddard, MSM (May 2, 1980 – May 17, 2006) was the first Canadian woman to be killed in action since World War II, the first female Canadian Armed Forces member killed during combat duty, and the first Canadian female combat soldier to be killed on the front lines. She was also the 16th Canadian soldier killed in Canadian operations in Afghanistan.

== Profile ==
Born to British and Canadian school teachers in Madang, Papua New Guinea, Goddard spent most of her childhood in various locations, including Black Lake and Lac la Ronge, Saskatchewan. She attended junior high in Edmonton, Alberta, and high school in Antigonish, Nova Scotia. Nicknamed "Carebear", by her ski team in Nova Scotia, her hobbies included cross-country skiing and running, and she had competed in biathlon events. She led a local Scout troop with her fiancé (later husband), Jason Beam, while they were officer cadets at the Royal Military College, in Kingston, Ontario.

Captain Goddard arrived in Afghanistan in January 2006, and had been serving with Princess Patricia's Canadian Light Infantry as a forward observation officer at the time of her death; her parent unit was the 1st Regiment Royal Canadian Horse Artillery. She was "known as a forceful and secure commander whose troops were extremely loyal".

== Battle ==
Goddard was killed on May 17, 2006, during a firefight in the Panjwaye District. It was part of a joint two-day operation between Canadian and Afghan troops, to secure Kandahar's outskirts after a rumor of Taliban preparations to launch an assault on the city. As troops were moving into a mosque to capture 15 alleged Taliban members, several dozen hidden militants began firing from neighbouring houses. As a crew commander, Goddard was standing half-exposed in her LAV III, which was hit by two rocket-propelled grenades early in the battle. The battle lasted most of the day on the 17th and into the night, and ended shortly after an American B-1 Lancer dropped a 500lb bomb. In the end, the two-day operation saw Goddard, an Afghan National Army soldier, and 40 Taliban killed, as well as approximately 20 Taliban captured, which early reports mistakenly said could have included Mullah Dadullah.

== After effects ==
Prime Minister Stephen Harper was the first to mention Goddard's death, opening a parliamentary debate hours later, stating that he was not certain it was a first female combat death for Canada, and that he would not release her name until her family had been notified.

General Richard Hillier, the former chief of defence staff, wrote in his autobiography A Soldier First: Bullets, Bureaucrats and the Politics of War that officials in the Prime Minister's Office ordered the military to hide the return to Canada of Goddard's body because they did not want her flag-draped coffin seen on the news.

The family arranged for a public funeral at St. Barnabas Anglican Church in Calgary, held on Friday May 26, 2006.

It was later announced that her husband Jason Beam would be the first widower to receive the Memorial Cross. The Memorial Cross (also known as the Silver Cross) has traditionally been presented to widows and mothers of Canadian war dead. After Goddard's death, policies have changed on the traditions of presenting the Memorial Cross to widows or mothers of the ones killed. Now, members of the Canadian Forces are required to choose who (out of up to three people) will receive the Memorial Cross(es).

== Tributes ==
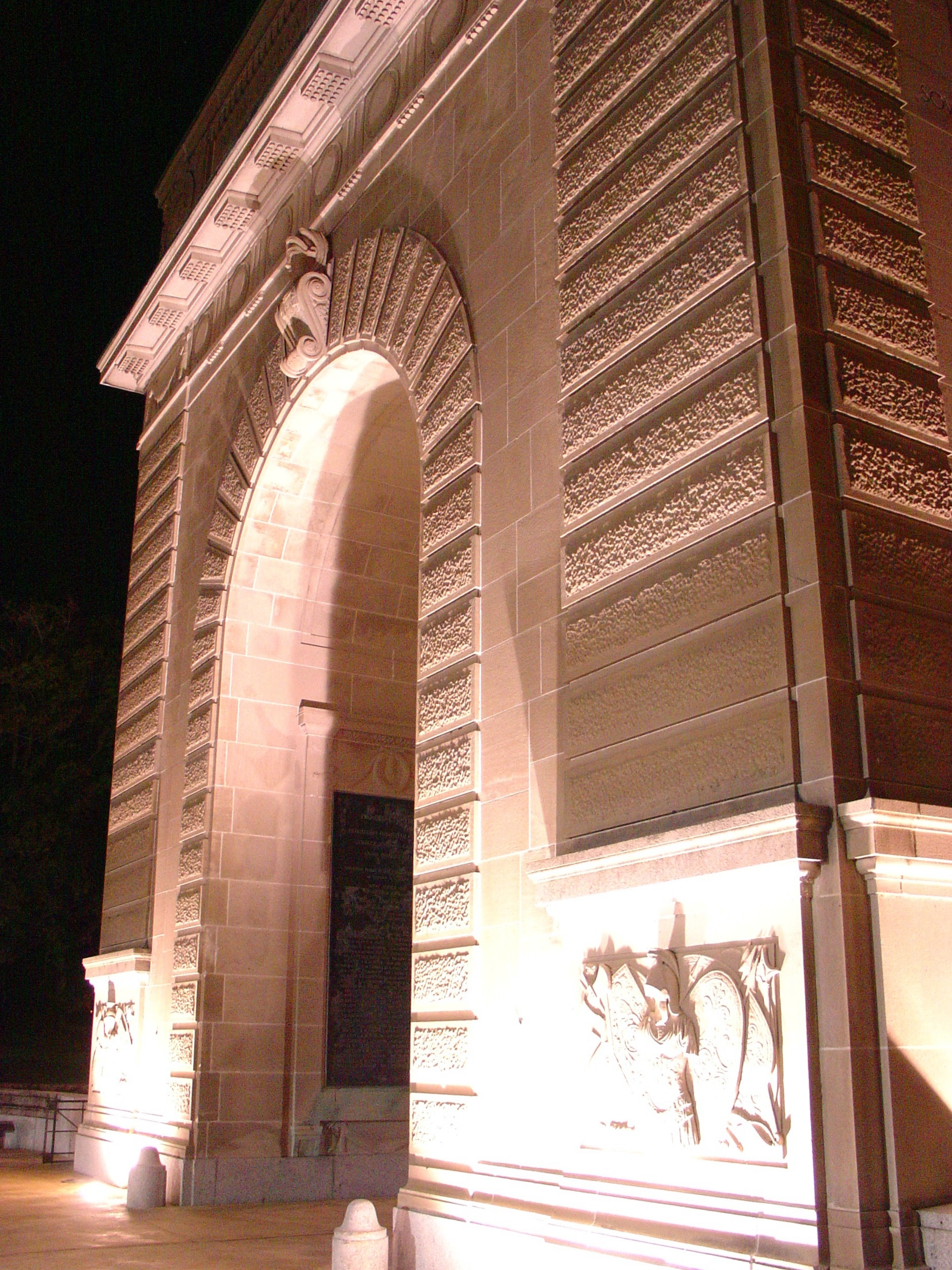
Memorial Arch

- The Captain Nichola Goddard School, a middle school in Calgary, Alberta, is named after Goddard.
- Nichola Goddard's name was etched on the Memorial Arch at Royal Military College of Canada in Kingston, Ontario
- Classmates and Friends of Capt. Nichola Goddard at Royal Military College of Canada remembered her in the e-veritas alumni magazine
- Light Up Papua New Guinea is an international development project by the University of Calgary’s Light Up the World Foundation and the family of Capt. Nichola Goddard in her honour. The goal is for nearly 2,000 non-polluting solar-powered lighting systems in first aid posts will replace hazardous kerosene lamps.
- The Captain Nichola K.S. Goddard Memorial Scholarship Fund.
- Nichola Goddard's name was added to the Scouts Canada Loyalist Area (Kingston, ON) Memorial Wall at Camp Otter Lake for those Scouters who have "Gone Home".
- Trig Goddard. In November 2006, her colleagues at CFB Shilo dedicated a trig marker on the base to Nichola in a ceremony attended by more than 600 soldiers (A trig marker is a survey point that fixes one's location and orientation and is used for navigation). Trig Goddard would serve as a constant reminder of Nichola's sacrifice. Captain Sean Tremblay wrote, “By naming one of these markers after Nichola we will be using the memory of our friend, and of her sacrifice, to help us fix our path as we try to make moral decisions just actions, to guide us and help us keep doing what is good and right.” SUNRAY: The Death and Life of Captain Nichola Goddard, by Valerie Fortney. p. 302. / ISBN 1-55470-300-X / ISBN 978-1-55470-300-5
- A tree was planted in memory of Captain Nichola Goddard at Fish Creek Provincial Park.
- The Captain Nichola Goddard Memorial Trophy awarded to the top CF Women's Soccer Team performing in the CF regional tournament.
- Captain Nichola K.S. Goddard Memorial Sword is presented to the best Regular Officer Training Plan artillery senior cadet at Royal Military College of Canada to carry in their fourth year.
- Her death inspired Canadian band The Trews to write their song "Highway of Heroes".
- Her high school, Dr. John Hugh Gillis Regional High School, has a memorial plaque hung in the main foyer in memory and honour.
- A Canadian Coast Guard mid-shore patrol vessel was named after her.
- There is a new middle school in Calgary, Alberta, that is named Captain Nichola Goddard.
- A slow air titled "Lament for Captain Goddard" dedicated to Captain Goddard for highland bagpipe was composed by Jeff McCarthy of the Canadian Black Watch.
- The book, Sunray the Death and Life of Captain Nichola Goddard by Valerie Fortney, was published by Key Porter Books in 2010.

== Honours and decorations ==
Goddard received the following honours and decorations during her military career and posthumously.

Capt Goddard was posthumously awarded the Sacrifice Medal on Monday, November 9, 2009. Sacrifice Medals are awarded to members of the Canadian Forces and those who work with them who have been wounded or killed by hostile action and to Canadian Forces members who died as a result of service. She is also a recipient of the General Campaign Star for her combat deployment under Operation Athena.

She was also posthumously awarded the Meritorious Service Medal on Oct 27, 2006
