= Robert Grierson Combe =

Recipient of the Victoria Cross

Robert Grierson Combe VC
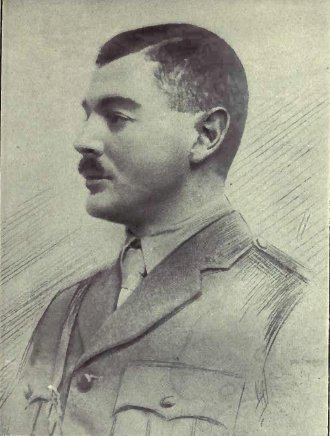
- Born: 5 August 1880; Aberdeen, Scotland
- Died: 3 May 1917 (aged 36); Near Acheville, France
- Military career
- Allegiance: Canada
- Branch: Canadian Expeditionary Force
- Service years: 1915–1917
- Rank: Lieutenant
- Units: 27th (City of Winnipeg) Battalion, CEF
- Conflicts: First World War †
- Awards: Victoria Cross

Robert Grierson Combe VC (5 August 1880 – 3 May 1917) was a Canadian recipient of the Victoria Cross, the highest award for gallantry in the face of the enemy awarded to members of the British and Commonwealth forces during the First World War.

== Early life ==
Combe was born in Aberdeen, Scotland, on 5 August 1880, son of James Combe, a hotel owner, and Elizabeth Jardine. He attended Ferryhill School and Aberdeen Grammar School before completing an apprenticeship as a pharmacist. He later worked as a chemist in Aberdeen and London and served for a year in the 1st Volunteer Battalion, Royal Fusiliers.

Combe moved to Canada in April 1906 and initially worked as a pharmacist in Moosomin, Saskatchewan. After relocating to Melville, Saskatchewan in 1908, where he set up his own pharmacy and later opened another branch in Dubuc. He married Jean Traquair Donald in Melville on 18 August 1909.

== First World War ==
Combe enlisted in the Canadian Expeditionary Force (CEF) in April 1915 at Prince Albert and was commissioned as a lieutenant in the 53rd Infantry Battalion. After arriving in the United Kingdom in September 1915, he served on the instructional staff and qualified as a major. Desiring front-line tactical command, he voluntarily reverted to the rank of lieutenant and transferred to France in March 1916 and joined the 27th (City of Winnipeg) Battalion.

In June 1916, he developed severe lower-back pain (lumbago) while on duty in the trenches and had to be taken to England for treatment. Following recovery, he served with the 11th Reserve Battalion at Shorncliffe until declared fit for active service in early 1917, rejoining the 27th Battalion in France on 25 April 1917 during the Battle of Arras.

== Victoria Cross action ==
On 3 May 1917, during the Third Battle of the Scarpe south of Acheville, France, the 27th Battalion launched an assault on enemy positions. Heavy artillery fire killed or wounded most of his company, leaving Combe as the sole surviving officer.

Combe steadied the surviving men and led five soldiers through the barrage to the objective. He gathered scattered groups of troops and organized a grenade attack, capturing 250 yards of trench along with 80 prisoners. While personally leading his bombers in a charge against retreating enemy forces, Combe was killed by an enemy sniper.

The official citation for his Victoria Cross was gazetted on 27 June 1917:

For most conspicuous bravery and example. He steadied his Company under intense fire, and led them through the enemy barrage, reaching the objective with only five men. With great coolness and courage Lieutenant Combe proceeded to bomb the enemy, and on the arrival of reinforcements he reorganised his company, captured the company objective, and took 80 prisoners. He repeatedly charged the enemy, driving them before him, and, whilst personally leading his bombers, was killed by an enemy sniper. His conduct inspired all ranks, and it is entirely due to his magnificent courage that the position was carried, secured and held.

== Memorials and medal ==
Combe was buried in a battlefield cemetery near Acheville. Subsequent heavy shelling destroyed the burial site, leaving his grave unrecovered. He is commemorated on the Canadian National Vimy Memorial in France.

In 1919, Edward, Prince of Wales, presented Combe's Victoria Cross to his widow in Regina, Saskatchewan. The medal is preserved in the collection of the Provincial Archives of Saskatchewan in Regina. Combe is also commemorated by Combe Reservoir near Melville, Saskatchewan.
