= Manitoba Regiment =

The Manitoba Regiment
- Active: 1920-1936
- Country: Canada
- Branch: Canadian Militia
- Type: Line Infantry
- Role: Infantry
- Size: One Regiment
- Part of: Non-Permanent Active Militia
- Garrison/HQ: Winnipeg, Manitoba
- Engagements: First World War
- Battle honours: Mount Sorrel; Somme, 1916, '18; Flers-Courcelette; Thiepval; Ancre Heights; Arras, 1917, '18; Vimy, 1917; Arleux; Scarpe, 1917, '18; Hill 70; Ypres, 1917; Passchendaele; Amiens; Hindenburg Line; Drocourt-Quéant; Canal du Nord; Cambrai, 1918; Pursuit to Mons; France and Flanders, 1915–18

The Manitoba Regiment was an infantry regiment of the Non-Permanent Active Militia of the Canadian Militia (now the Canadian Army). In 1936, the regiment was disbanded as a result of a country wide reorganization of the Canadian Militia.

== History ==
As a result of the Otter Commission, The Manitoba Regiment was created on 15 March 1920, by incorporating the 27th Battalion, CEF, into the post-WWI Canadian Militia.

The regiment was headquartered in Winnipeg, Manitoba.

On 1 February 1936, The Manitoba Regiment was disbanded along with 13 other regiments as part of the 1936 Canadian Militia reorganization.

== Perpetuations ==
- 27th Battalion (City of Winnipeg), CEF

== Battle honours ==
- Mount Sorrel
- Somme, 1916, '18
- Flers-Courcelette (Note: Selected to be borne on colours and appointments)
- Thiepval
- Ancre Heights
- Arras, 1917, '18
- Vimy, 1917
- Arleux
- Scarpe, 1917, '18
- Hill 70
- Ypres, 1917
- Passchendaele
- Amiens
- Hindenburg Line
- Drocourt-Quéant
- Canal du Nord
- Cambrai, 1918
- Pursuit to Mons
- France and Flanders, 1915–18
