= 27th Battalion (City of Winnipeg), CEF =

27th Battalion
- Active: 1915–18
- Country: Canada
- Branch: Canadian Expeditionary Force
- Type: Infantry
- Part of: 6th Brigade, 2nd Division
- Garrison/HQ: Winnipeg
- Engagements: First World War: Western Front
- Battle honours: MOUNT SORREL; SOMME, 1916, '18; Flers-Courcelette; Thiepval; Ancre Heights; ARRAS, 1917, '18; Vimy, 1917; Arleux; Scarpe, 1917, '18; HILL 70; Ypres 1917; Passchendaele; AMIENS; HINDENBURG LINE; Drocourt-Quéant; Canal du Nord; Cambrai, 1918; PURSUIT TO MONS; FRANCE AND FLANDERS, 1915–18

Insignia
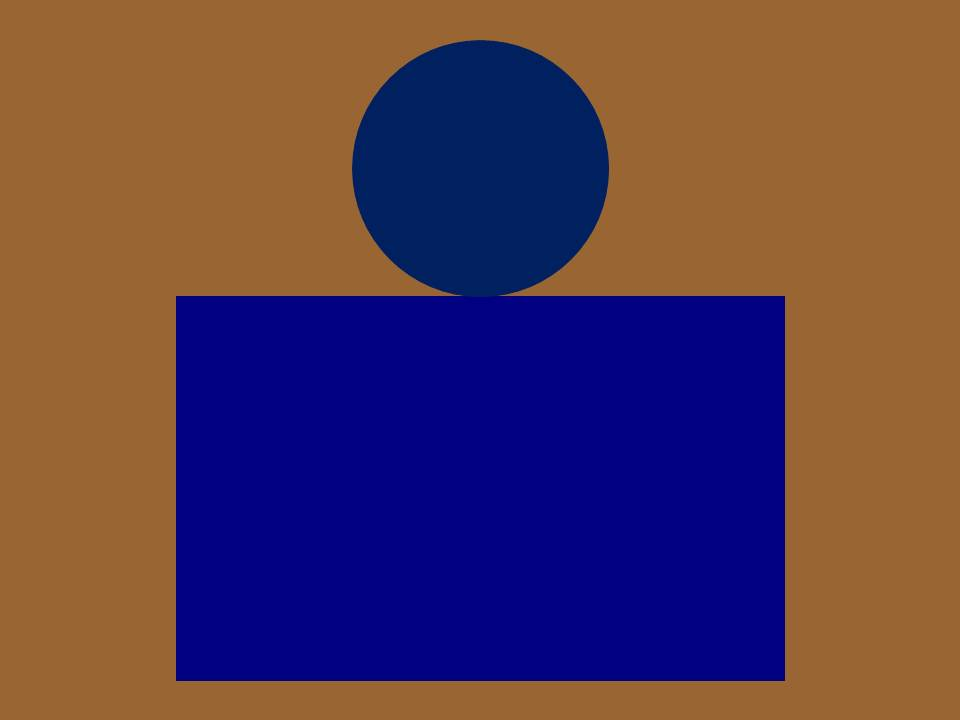
- Identification symbol

The 27th Battalion (City of Winnipeg), CEF was an infantry battalion of the Canadian Expeditionary Force during the First World War. The battalion was authorized on 7 November 1914 and embarked for Great Britain on 17 May 1915. It disembarked in France on 18 September 1915, where it fought as part of the 6th Infantry Brigade, 2nd Canadian Division in France and Flanders until the end of the war. The battalion was disbanded on 15 September 1920.

The 27th Battalion recruited in Brandon, Portage la Prairie and Winnipeg, Manitoba and Kenora and Rainy River, Ontario and was mobilized at Winnipeg.

== History ==
The 27th City of Winnipeg Battalion was the first independent battalion to be raised in Manitoba in the First World War. Officially it was not given a name and fell among the many nameless Canadian battalions raised to conform with the new numbering system introduced by Col. Sam Hughes, Canada's Minister of Militia and Defence in 1914.

The battalion was raised as part of a response to the demand for fresh reinforcements early in 1915, as Canada struggled overseas with its single division. It became part of the 2nd Division, 6th Infantry Brigade along with its sister 28th Battalion, 29th, and 31st Calgary Battalions. A common private of the 27th Battalion during the First World War could expect to earn between $1.00 and $1.10 a day, or around $30 a month.

The 27th Battalion, with the 2nd Division, arrived in France in September, 1915, and met up with the 1st Division by mid-month. Together these two divisions formed the Canadian Corps and were led by General Alderson. The Canadian Corps, including the 27th, would not participate in any major offensive for almost a full year, when the battalion would receive its "baptism of fire" at the Battle of St. Eloi, 5 kilometres from Ypres.

It was reported the officers of the 27th had not slept for over 100 hours, this was most apparent with the commander, Irvine R. Snider, a veteran of the North-West Rebellion of 1885 and the South African War, of the 27th Battalion who, during the Battle of St. Eloi, stayed awake for six straight days trying to relieve the strain "on his beloved boys". After the battle he broke down and cried, he was removed from command "being diagnosed with shell shock". The Battle of St. Eloi had claimed 40 of his men's lives and wounded another 189.

The Somme Valley became the new objective of the Canadian Corps. When the Canadians arrived in the Somme Valley the British had been fighting for 3 months and they had traded 250,000 men for 8 kilometres of German trenches.

One of the most notable battles of Somme the 27th Battalion participated in was the Battle of Courcelette on September 15, 1916. This battle marked the first time tanks were used in warfare. However, all six tanks that used that day were knocked out; they were incredibly unreliable.

Battalions wanted to ensure they received the glory and credit for their captures. One way of doing this was marking the prisoners with the battalion's insignia or the unit's designation. For example, at the Battle of Courcelette some of the men of the 27th brought green paint forward and marked the 250 prisoners they took with a rectangle and a circle above it as they sent back to the rear.

According to historian Tim Cook, the Germans ranked the Canadian 1st and 2nd Divisions among the top eight deadliest and dangerous divisions. The 2nd Division came overseas following the 1st Division and consequently had big expectations riding on them. At the Second Battle of Ypres in the spring of 1915, only arriving on the battlefield a week before with little experience in warfare, the 1st Canadian Division was the only division that held its ground against the German's gas attack. Neither the British nor the French could hold their ground and had to fall back. It was largely due to the stubbornness of the Canadians that the Allies were able to repulse the attack.

The perpetuation of the 27th Battalion was assigned in 1920 to the Manitoba Regiment. The Manitoba Regiment was disbanded in 1936. The perpetuation was later transferred on 19 October 1999 to the Royal Winnipeg Rifles

== Commanding officers ==
The 27th Battalion had three commanding officers during the war:

- Lieutenant-Colonel Irvine R. Snider, 17 May 1915 – 15 April 1916
- Lieutenant-Colonel Patrick J. Daley, CMG, DSO, 15 April 1916 – 4 April 1918
- Lieutenant-Colonel H.J. Riley, DSO, 4 April 1918 – Demobilization

== Victoria Crosses ==
Two members of the 27th Battalion were awarded the Victoria Cross. Lt. Robert Grierson Combe was posthumously awarded the Victoria Cross for his actions near Acheville, France on 3 May 1917. Pte. James Peter Robertson was posthumously awarded the Victoria Cross for his actions at Passchendaele on 6 November 1917.

== Battle honours ==
The 27th Battalion was awarded the following battle honours:

- MOUNT SORREL
- SOMME, 1916, '18
- Flers-Courcelette
- Thiepval
- Ancre Heights
- ARRAS, 1917, '18
- Vimy, 1917
- Arleux
- Scarpe, 1917, '18
- HILL 70
- Ypres 1917
- Passchendaele
- AMIENS
- HINDENBURG LINE
- Drocourt-Quéant
- Canal du Nord
- Cambrai, 1918
- PURSUIT TO MONS
- FRANCE AND FLANDERS, 1915–18

== See also ==
- List of infantry battalions in the Canadian Expeditionary Force
