= Hero-class patrol vessel =

Canadian Coast Guard ship class

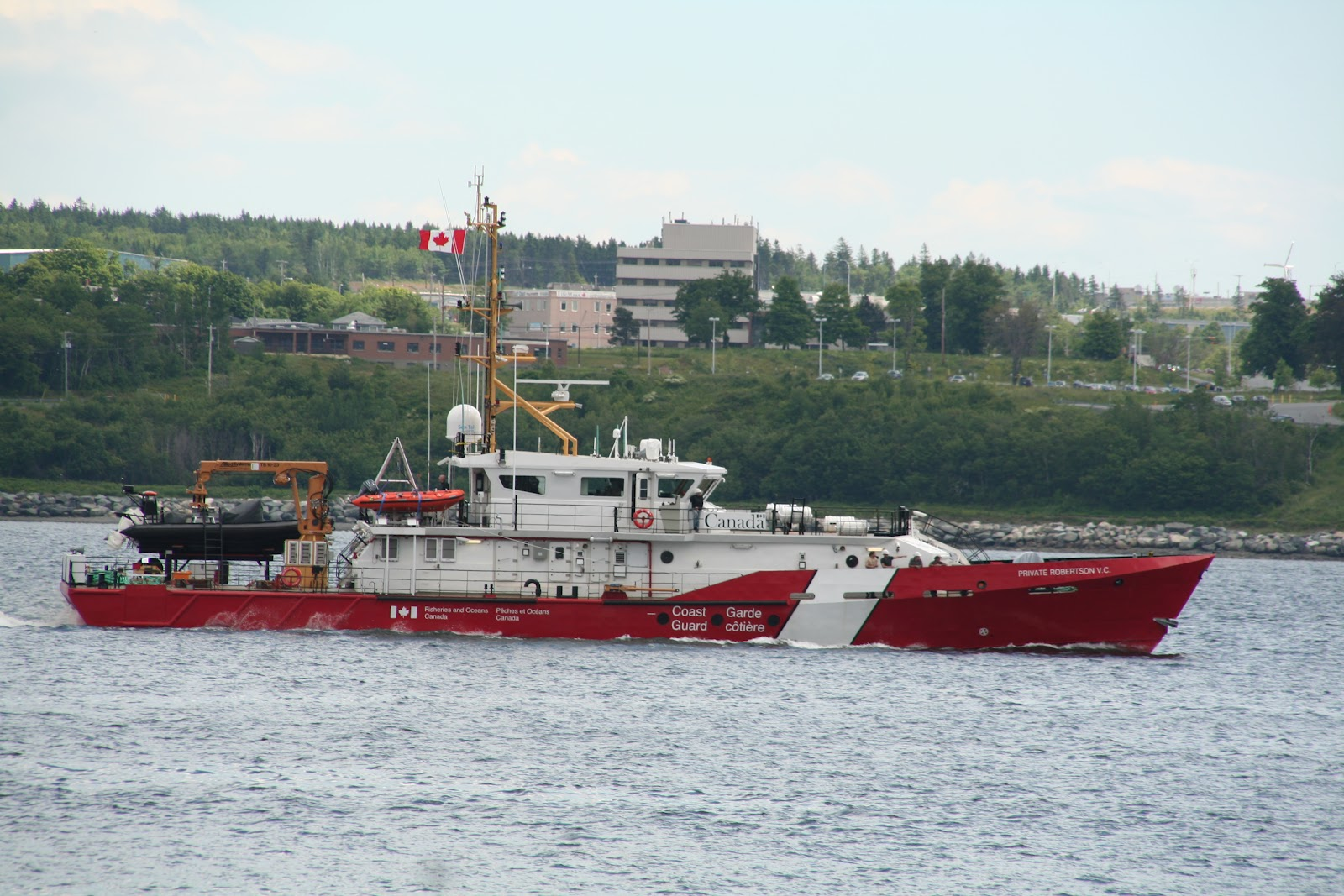
- CCGS Private Robertson V.C., the first of the Hero class to enter service

Class overview
- Name: Hero class
- Builders: Irving Shipbuilding
- Operators: Canadian Coast Guard
- Built: 2011–2014
- In service: 2012–present
- In commission: 2012–2014
- Planned: 9
- Active: 9

General characteristics
- Type: Patrol vessel
- Tonnage: 253 GT; 75 NT
- Length: 42.8 m (140 ft 5 in)
- Beam: 7 m (23 ft 0 in)
- Draught: 2.8 m (9 ft 2 in)
- Installed power: 4,992 kW (6,694 hp)
- Propulsion: 2 × MTU 4000M diesel engines
- Speed: 25 knots (46 km/h)
- Range: 2,000 nautical miles (3,700 km) at 14 knots (26 km/h)
- Endurance: 14 days
- Boats & landing craft carried: 2 × RHIB
- Capacity: 5
- Complement: 9
- Sensors & processing systems: 1 × Sperry Marine Visionmaster FT

The Hero-class patrol vessels, previously the Mid-Shore Patrol Vessel Project, is a series of nine patrol vessels constructed by Halifax Shipyards for the Canadian Coast Guard. Based on the Dutch Damen Stan 4207 patrol vessel, construction began in 2011 and the first vessel entered service in 2012. The vessels are assigned to the Atlantic and Pacific coasts of Canada, used for coastal patrol duties.

== Vessel design ==
The initial Mid Shore Patrol Vessel Project centred on medium-sized patrol boats of 37 to 42 metres (121 to 138 ft) in length, operating up to 120 nautical miles (220 km) offshore at a maximum speed of 25 knots (46 km/h). Each vessel would carry one or two rigid-hulled inflatable boats (RHIBs) and have accommodation for nine Canadian Coast Guard personnel as well as up to five Department of Fisheries and Oceans or Royal Canadian Mounted Police (RCMP) officers. The vessels were originally designed to be equipped with a stern launching ramp, allowing RHIBs to be launched and retrieved while the vessel was in motion.

The final design for Hero-class vessels is based on those of the Dutch Damen Stan 4207 patrol vessel. The vessels are 42.8 m (140 ft) long overall with a beam of 7 m (23 ft) and a draught of 2.8 m (9 ft 2 in). The vessels have a 253 gross tonnage (GT) and a 75 net tonnage (NT). The ships are propelled by two controllable pitch propellers and bow thrusters powered by two MTU 4000M geared diesel engines creating 4,992 kW (6,694 hp). This gives the vessels a maximum speed of 25 knots (46 km/h). The Hero class have a diesel fuel capacity of 34.00 m^{3} (7,480 imp gal), a range of 2,000 nautical miles (3,700 km) at 14 knots (26 km/h) and can stay at sea for up to 14 days.

The vessels are equipped with two RHIBs launched by a single Allied Marine TB10-23 davit. The patrol ships have Sperry Marine Visionmaster FT radar that operates on the S and X bands. The Hero class have a complement of nine with capacity for five more. According to CBC News on 13 November 2012, Canadian Minister of Defence Peter MacKay announced that Canada was considering arming the Hero-class vessels, during a speech he delivered at the launch of CCGS Caporal Kaeble V.C., the second vessel of the class. MacKay said the Organization of American States had suggested Canada reconsider arming Canadian Coast Guard vessels to help counter the drug trade and people smuggling. Coast Guard vessels have never been armed before, while, occasionally, when carrying elements of the RCMP, the RCMP have carried small arms. A Senate committee recommended Coast Guard vessels should be armed. Michael Byers, a law professor and commentator on Arctic sovereignty and maritime law has argued that Canadian Coast Guard vessels should have the "quiet authority of a deck-mounted gun".

Criticism of the design and capabilities were raised by safety representatives, citing eleven issues. The vessels suffered numerous issues over their first years of service, including bad wiring, premature corrosion and gearbox failure. Irving Shipbuilding responded to the claims, acknowledging the problems as minor, but stating that Canadian Coast Guard officials and representatives from the marine classification society Lloyd's Register certified the vessels. Five vessels of the class are to receive redesigned galleys after the initial ones were deemed unsafe.

== Procurement history ==
In 2006, the Government of Canada under Prime Minister Stephen Harper promised to continue the Mid Shore Patrol Vessel Project initiated by the government of former Prime Minister Paul Martin that envisioned eight vessels; however, no funding was provided. On 19 March 2007 the Federal Budget committed $324 million for four mid shore patrol vessels and two offshore fishery science vessels.

On 25 March 2008, in an announcement that cancelled the bidding process for the Joint Support Ship Project for Canadian Forces Maritime Command, the Government of Canada placed the coast guard's Mid Shore Patrol Vessel Project on hold due to bids that were significantly higher than budgeted allocations. The Canadian Coast Guard submitted a modified vessel design based on reduced capabilities and cost. On 26 February 2009, the Government of Canada reissued a call for bids for twelve mid shore patrol vessels.

On 2 September 2009, the Minister of Fisheries and Oceans and Minister of National Defence announced that nine mid shore patrol vessels were being ordered from Irving Shipbuilding to be constructed at Halifax Shipyard in Halifax, Nova Scotia for a cost of $194 million.

== Vessels in class ==
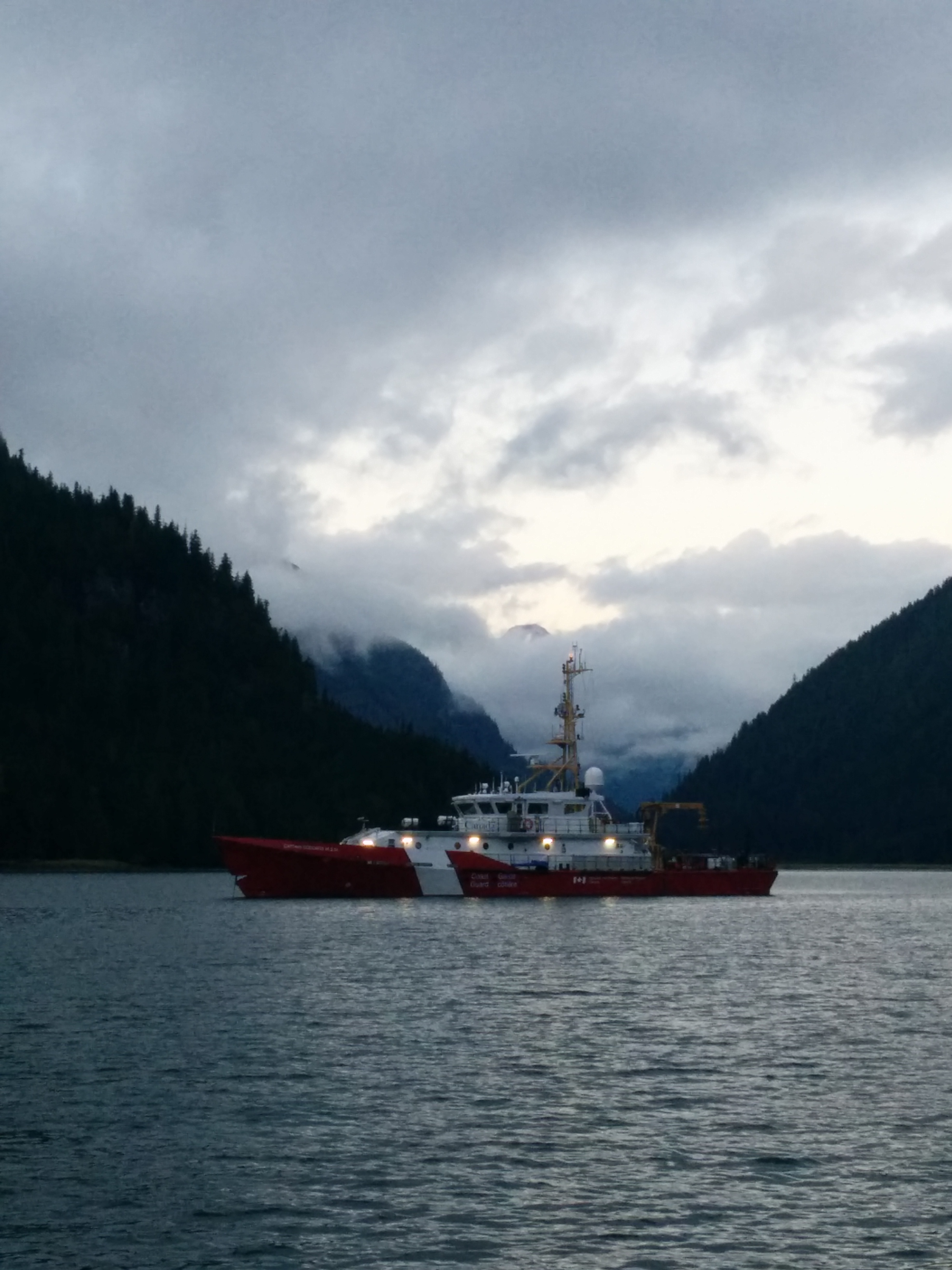
Captain Goddard M.S.M. at dusk in British Columbia waters

Each of the nine Hero-class patrol vessels are named after personnel from the Royal Canadian Mounted Police (officers), Canadian Coast Guard (sailors, aircrew), Department of Fisheries and Oceans (fishery officers) and Canadian Forces (soldiers, sailors, aircrew) who are credited with performing exceptional or heroic acts during their service.

Hero class
Name	Builder	Launched	In service	Status
CCGS Private Robertson V.C.	Irving Shipbuilding, Halifax, Nova Scotia	2012	2012	Active
CCGS Caporal Kaeble V.C.	Irving Shipbuilding, Halifax, Nova Scotia	2012	2013	Active
CCGS Corporal Teather C.V.	Irving Shipbuilding, Halifax, Nova Scotia	2013	2013	Active
CCGS Constable Carrière	Irving Shipbuilding, Halifax, Nova Scotia	2013	2013	Active
CCGS G. Peddle S.C.	Irving Shipbuilding, Halifax, Nova Scotia	2013	2013	Active
CCGS Corporal McLaren M.M.V.	Irving Shipbuilding, Halifax, Nova Scotia	2013	2013	Awaiting scrapping as of June 2024
CCGS A. LeBlanc	Irving Shipbuilding, Halifax, Nova Scotia	2014	2014	Active
CCGS M. Charles M.B.	Irving Shipbuilding, Halifax, Nova Scotia	2014	2014	Active
CCGS Captain Goddard M.S.M.	Irving Shipbuilding, Halifax, Nova Scotia	2014	2014	Active

== Service history ==
The main task for these vessels is to provide maritime security and fisheries enforcement off Canada's Atlantic and Pacific coasts. Secondary tasks are marine search and rescue and marine pollution control. Four of the vessels are providing security on the Great Lakes and the Saint Lawrence Seaway. The first vessel, Private Robertson V.C. entered service in 2012 and the last, Captain Goddard M.S.M. in 2014. In November 2015, G. Peddle S.C. was taken out of service for two months due to issues with the lifeboat system. In May 2016 Corporal McLaren M.M.V. was taken out of service to address corrosion on stern plates. In February 2017, a government report claiming poisoned water aboard some Canadian Coast Guard vessels named Private Robertson V.C., Corporal Teather C.V. and Constable Carrière among them. While undergoing a refit at Sambro, Nova Scotia, on 17 November 2018 Corporal McLaren M.M.V. was released from the vessel's cradle, allegedly due to vandalism. The vessel had slid down the slip and lay partially submerged in the water, though the damage was light. The ship was refloated on 26 November 2018 and taken to a dock in Sambro, Nova Scotia where the full extent of the damage would be assessed. As of June 2024 the vessel is awaiting scrapping. In 2019, it was reported that the vessels suffered from stability issues in adverse weather conditions that prevented them from sailing. G. Peddle S.C. was taken out of service in June 2020 after the vessel suffered a complete failure of its engines. The ship was lifted out of the water and its two main diesel engines were removed. The ship is expected to return to service in mid-2021.

== See also ==
- Tenochtitlan-class patrol vessel
- UKBF 42m Customs Cutter
- Sentinel-class cutter
