= Sperry Marine Northrop Grumman =

UK-based company

Sperry Marine

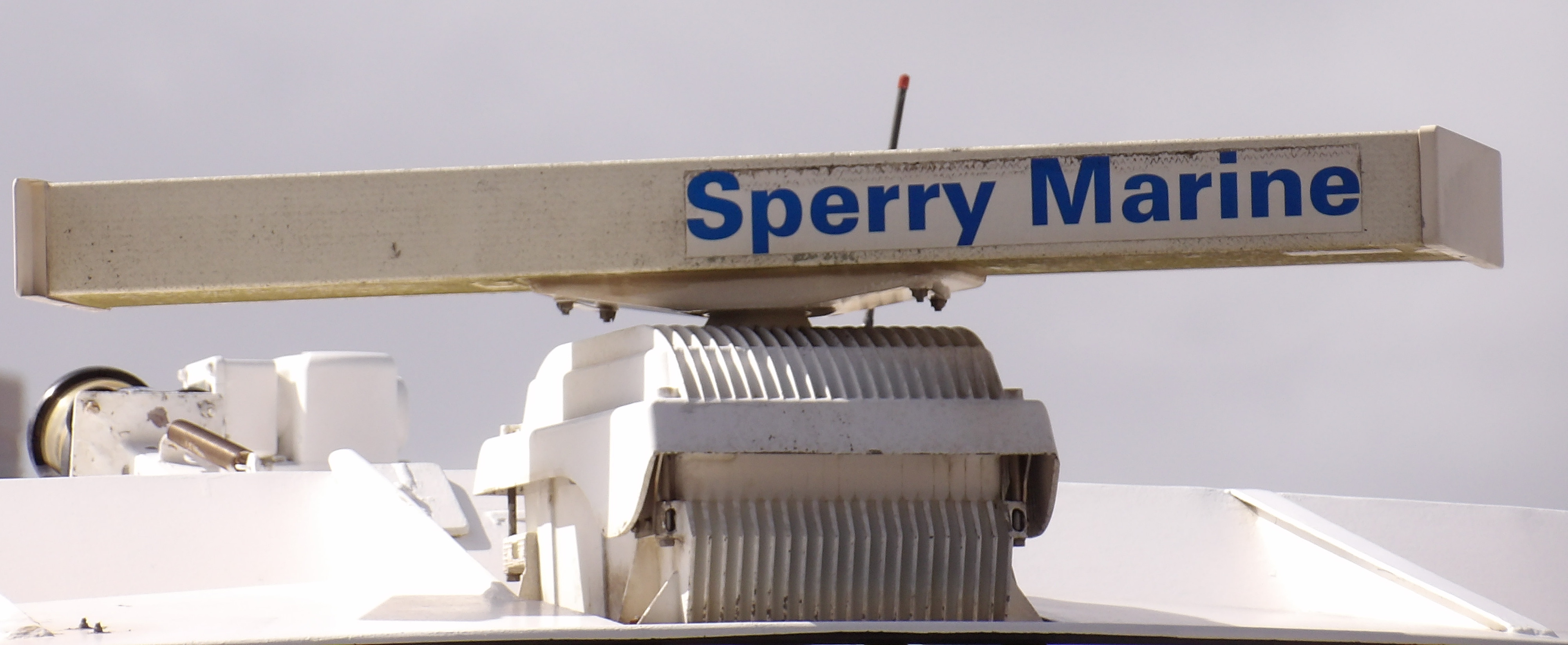
- A Sperry Marine VisionMaster FT S band Radar
- Founded: 1997
- Headquarters: 118 Burlington Road, New Malden, London, United Kingdom
- Area served: Worldwide
- Products: Navigation radar ECDIS; Steering systems Integrated bridge systems Compass systems Speed logs Maritime navigation
- Number of employees: 330 (2026)
- Website: SperryMarine.com

Sperry Marine is a maritime navigation systems company headquartered in New Malden, United Kingdom. The company develops and supplies navigation, integrated bridge, radar, electronic chart display and information systems (ECDIS), autopilot, gyrocompass, and voyage management systems for commercial shipping and naval vessels worldwide. Since 2001, the company has operated as part of Northrop Grumman Mission Systems.

Sperry Marine was formed in 1997 through the consolidation of historic maritime navigation companies, including Decca Marine, Sperry Gyroscope and C. Plath. The company serves commercial shipping, offshore, naval and special-purpose vessel markets and supports more than 6,000 vessels globally though a network of service locations and partners.

== History ==
The origins of Sperry Marine trace back to several pioneering navigation and marine electronics companies.

=== Sperry Gyroscope ===
Sperry Gyroscope was founded in the United States following the invention of the gyrocompass by inventor Elmer Ambrose Sperry in the early 20th century. The gyrocompass became widely adopted in naval and commercial shipping applications because it provided reliable directional reference independent of magnetic interference.

Its founder, Elmer Ambrose Sperry, was working on the first prototype of the gyrocompass at the same time as Hermann Anschütz-Kaempfe was developing his. Eventually, the rivalry between these two inventors over the gyrocompass went to court, where Albert Einstein was included as an unambiguous expert.

During the First and Second World Wars, Sperry systems were used extensively aboard naval vessels and contributed to developments in fire control, stabilization, and navigation technology.

=== Decca Marine ===
Decca Marine originated from the British Decca Navigator Company and became known for marine radar and radio navigation systems. The company played a significant role in the development of commercial marine radar technologies, including true-motion radar displays and anti-collision navigation systems.

=== C. Plath ===
The German company C. Plath, founded in Hamburg in the 19th century, specialized in magnetic compasses, navigation instruments, and later gyrocompass and bridge systems. C. Plath products were widely used in merchant and naval fleets.

=== Formation of Sperry Marine ===
Sperry Marine was established in 1997 through the integration of the marine navigation businesses of Sperry Gyroscope, Decca Marine, and C. Plath under Litton Industries

In 2001, Northrop Grumman acquired Litton Industries, including Sperry Marine, which subsequently became part of Northrop Grumman Mission Systems.

== Products and Systems ==
Sperry Marine develops integrated navigation and bridge systems for commercial and naval vessels. Its product portfolio includes:

- Integrated Bridge Systems
- Marine Radar Systems
- Electronic Chart Display and Information Systems (ECDIS)
- Gyrocompasses and Fibre Optic Gyro Systems
- Autopilot and Steering Control Systems
- Navigation Sensors and Displays

Notable product families include the VisionMaster integrated bridge systems, NAVIGAT compasses and NAVIPILOT autopilot systems.

== Digitalisation and Autonomous Navigation ==
During the 2020s, Sperry Marine expanded its focus towards digital maritime technologies, including autonomous-ready bridge systems, cybersecurity, and resilient navigation technologies.

The company has been involved in projects involving

- Autonomous-ready vessel bridge systems
- Fibre-Optic gyro systems designed to improve resilience against GNSS jamming and spoofing
- S-100 electronic navigation standards

in 2025 Sperry Marine received the SMART4SEA Autonomous Shipping Award for delivering cutting-edge navigation and control systems that enable autonomous vessel maneuvering and enhanced situational awareness.

== Operations ==
Sperry Marine operates through a global network of offices, service stations, and partners supporting commercial and naval customers. The company maintains operations in Europe, Asia, the Americas, and the Middle East. Its engineering departments are based in New Malden and Hamburg. Currently the company employs over 300 people.
