= List of shipwrecks in 2012 =

The list of shipwrecks in 2012 includes ships sunk, foundered, grounded, or otherwise lost during 2012.

table of contents
2012
Jan	Feb	Mar	Apr
May	Jun	Jul	Aug
Sep	Oct	Nov	Dec

== January ==
=== 1 January ===
List of shipwrecks: 1 January 2012
Ship	State	Description
Jin Hang Bo 53	China	The hopper vessel sank at Port Elizabeth, South Africa.
Safina	Kenya	The ferry collided with a cargo ship off Lamu Island and sank with the loss of nine lives. There were at least 48 survivors.
Skulptor Tomskiy	Belize	The refrigerated cargo ship ran aground in the Morskoy Canal in St. Petersburg, Russia. She was refloated the next day with the assistance of four tugs.
Unidentified ship	Unknown	Overloaded with a cargo of 1,700 tons of stone, the bulk carrier ran aground in the Yangtze River in China after a navigation error. All crewmen on board were rescued.

=== 2 January ===
List of shipwrecks: 2 January 2012
Ship	State	Description
Delamar	Gibraltar	The cargo ship ran aground near Antwerp, Belgium. The ship was refloated the next day.

=== 4 January ===
List of shipwrecks: 4 January 2012
Ship	State	Description
Odin Sydfyen	Denmark	The passenger ferry ran aground near Tårs, Denmark. The ship was able to be refloated under her own power.

=== 7 January ===
List of shipwrecks: 7 January 2012
Ship	State	Description
MSC Poesia	Panama	The cruise ship ran aground on a reef off Grand Bahama. The ship remained on the reef for the day until it was eventually pulled off by four tugs.

=== 8 January ===
List of shipwrecks: 8 January 2012
Ship	State	Description
Tycoon	Panama	The phosphate carrier broke her mooring and was pushed into the cliffs at Flying Fish Cove, Christmas Island and broke up, spilling oil and phosphate into the sea. All fifteen crew were rescued by Royal Australian Navy RIBs.

=== 11 January ===
List of shipwrecks: 11 January 2012
Ship	State	Description
Anke Angela	Gibraltar	The cargo vessel ran aground in Kalmar Strait, in the Baltic Sea, Sweden.

=== 12 January ===
List of shipwrecks: 12 January 2012
Ship	State	Description
Harmony SW	Panama	The cargo vessel ran aground in the Kiel Canal.

=== 13 January ===
List of shipwrecks: 13 January 2012
Ship	State	Description
Costa Concordia	Italy	Costa Concordia after capsizing The Concordia-class cruise ship ran aground off Isola del Giglio, Tuscany (42°21′53″N 10°55′16″E). There were 32 deaths amongst the 4,252 people on board. Declared a constructive total loss, Costa Concordia was parbuckled upright on 17 September 2013. She was refloated on 14 July 2014, departing under tow on 23 July for Genoa, where she was scrapped.
FAS Provence	Bahamas	While under tow from Dakar the ship sank on the Medina Bank in the Mediterranean Sea.

=== 14 January ===
List of shipwrecks: 14 January 2012
Ship	State	Description
Doola No.3	South Korea	The tanker broke in two after an explosion onboard near Jawol Island in the Yellow Sea.

=== 15 January ===
List of shipwrecks: 15 January 2012
Ship	State	Description
Doola 3	South Korea	The tanker exploded and sank off Jawol Island with the loss of eleven of her sixteen crew.
Edirne	Sierra Leone	The tanker sank after an explosion onboard off the city of Durrës in Albania, with one crew member reported dead and two more reported missing.
Lady Moon	United Kingdom	The tanker sank off Al Hamriya, Dubai. Her five crew were rescued.
Unidentified fishing vessel	Unknown	The fishing vessel sank after colliding with the cargo ship Cheng Lu 28 (China) in the Hainan Strait off Hainan, China. Three crew members were reported missing.

=== 16 January ===
List of shipwrecks: 16 January 2012
Ship	State	Description
Mako	United States	The offshore supply vessel was destroyed by fire and sank in the Atlantic Ocean 6 nautical miles (11 km) off the coast of Nigeria.
Tit Bonhomme	Ireland	The fishing vessel sank, after hitting rocks, near Glandore Harbour, County Cork. Five crew members were reported missing.

=== 20 January ===
List of shipwrecks: 20 January 2012
Ship	State	Description
Aztec Maiden	Philippines	The cargo ship ran aground at Wijk aan Zee, North Holland, Netherlands. The ship was pulled free a day later and brought to IJmuiden for inspection.
Kayan 1	Sierra Leone	The cargo ship collided with Adria Blu (Tanzania) off Istanbul, Turkey and was beached. Her thirteen crew were rescued. A temporary repair was made and the ship was refloated. She was taken in to Istanbul.

=== 22 January ===
List of shipwrecks: 22 January 2012
Ship	State	Description
Hamed II	United Arab Emirates	The supply vessel sank off Al Hamriya, Dubai with the loss of one of her six crew.
Seaford 2	Philippines	The cargo vessel sank off San Jose, Philippines after suffering a severe list. All crew were rescued.
Sun Spirits	Panama	The cargo vessel sank off Binorong Point, Philippines after her cargo of iron ore shifted. All crew were rescued.

=== 24 January ===
List of shipwrecks: 24 January 2012
Ship	State	Description
Kimberly	United States	The 61-gross ton, 58-foot (17.7 m) fishing vessel ran aground in Jute Bay (57°32′30″N 151°51′00″W) on the coast of Kodiak Island in Alaska's Kodiak Archipelago during a gale. A United States Coast Guard helicopter rescued her crew of four on 25 January.

=== 25 January ===
List of shipwrecks: 25 January 2012
Ship	State	Description
Hallgrímur	Iceland	The fishing trawler sank in a storm off Ålesund, Norway. One crew member was rescued by a Royal Norwegian Air Force helicopter, with three others missing. The body of the trawler's captain was recovered from the sea north of Tromsø, Norway, in late March 2012. At the time of her loss, Hallgrímur had been on the way to the Fosen Gjenvinning breaker's yard at Stoksund in Sør-Trøndelag for scrapping.
Heritage	United States	The 109-gross ton, 67-foot (20.4 m) fishing vessel sank 1 nautical mile (1.9 km; 1.2 mi) east of Tanner Head (57°15′N 134°37′W) on the south end of Kodiak Island in Alaska's Kodiak Archipelago with seven people aboard. A United States Coast Guard Sikorsky MH-60 Jayhawk helicopter rescued two people, and the vessel Tuxedni (United States) picked up the other five.

=== 26 January ===
List of shipwrecks: 26 January 2012
Ship	State	Description
Delta Mariner	United States	The aircraft transport ship struck the Eggner Ferry Bridge over the Kentucky Lake. No injuries or loss of vehicles from the bridge were reported in the late night collision. As of 27 January, the ship remained stranded mid-stream with a large section of bridge wrapped around the upper forward decks, and dragging on the bottom.

=== 27 January ===
List of shipwrecks: 27 January 2012
Ship	State	Description
Rona	Moldova	The cargo ship was driven ashore near Akpinar, Turkey. Her crew were taken off the next day.

=== 29 January ===
List of shipwrecks: 29 January 2012
Ship	State	Description
Anna Akhmatova	Russia	The passenger ship was severely damaged by fire and sank at Moscow.

=== 30 January ===
List of shipwrecks: 30 January 2012
Ship	State	Description
Unknown trawler	Australia	The fishing trawler capsized and broke up after hitting the breakwall at the entrance to the Tweed River, New South Wales, Australia. Two crew were rescued.
Girl Rona	United Kingdom	The trawler capsized after hitting a sandbank whilst trying to enter Teignmouth harbour, Devon. All five crew rescued.

=== 31 January ===
List of shipwrecks: 31 January 2012
Ship	State	Description
Vera	Cambodia	The cargo ship sunk during a storm in the Black Sea.

== February ==
=== 2 February ===
List of shipwrecks: 2 February 2012
Ship	State	Description
Rabaul Queen	Papua New Guinea	The overloaded passenger ferry sank off the northwest coast of Papua New Guinea near Finschhafen. The final death toll is unknown because the exact number of passengers is unknown; estimates range from 88 to 223, with the official Commission of Inquiry estimating the dead at 146 to 165.

=== 5 February ===
List of shipwrecks: 5 February 2012
Ship	State	Description
Captain Ivan Vikulov	Malta	The cargo ship suffered an onboard explosion and caught fire in the Azov Sea. Her fourteen crew were rescued by the icebreaker Kapitan Moshkin (Russia). The severely damaged ship was subsequently anchored off Strilkove, Ukraine.

=== 7 February ===
List of shipwrecks: 7 February 2012
Ship	State	Description
Alaca 1	Panama	The cargo ship was crushed by ice in the Azov Sea off Kirillovka, Ukraine. Her twelve crew abandoned ship and were subsequently rescued.
Tanya Karpinskaya	Russia	The cargo ship was in collision with Kota Duta (Singapore) off Niigata, Japan. She consequently capsized and sank. Her seventeen crew were rescued.

=== 8 February ===
List of shipwrecks: 8 February 2012
Ship	State	Description
Feruz	Malta	The cargo ship was driven ashore at Samsun, Turkey. Her sixteen crew survived.
Hay K	Moldova	The cargo ship was driven ashore at Samsun.

=== 10 February ===
List of shipwrecks: 10 February 2012
Ship	State	Description
Bien Nam 17	Vietnam	The cargo ship collided with two other vessels and sank in the Nha Be River at Ho Chi Minh City with the loss of one of her twelve crew. The vessel was refloated on 23 February.

=== 13 February ===
List of shipwrecks: 13 February 2012
Ship	State	Description
Combattant	France	The hopper vessel struck a mooring and sank in the Rhône at Beaucaire, Gard.

=== 14 February ===
List of shipwrecks: 14 February 2012
Ship	State	Description
En Avant	Netherlands	The tug sank in the Bijlands Kanaal at Millingen aan de Rijn, Gelderland.

=== 15 February ===
List of shipwrecks: 15 February 2012
Ship	State	Description
Maverick Dos	Spain	The passenger ship ran aground in the Balearic Islands. All 25 people on board were rescued.
Shun King 8	Tonga	Cyclone Jasmine: The fishing vessel capsized and foundered off Tongatapu. Her three crew were rescued.
Takuo	Tonga	Cyclone Jasmine: The fishing vessel foundered.

=== 16 February ===
List of shipwrecks: 16 February 2012
Ship	State	Description
Karakumneft	Russia	The tanker ran aground off Iturup Island. Her 20 crew were rescued.
Phantom	Gibraltar	The cargo ship developed a severe list off Öland Sweden after her cargo shifted. Her six crew were rescued by a Swedish Coast Guard helicopter. Phantom was later towed in to Oskarshamn.
Yogi	France	The super-yacht sank in a storm during the early morning hours off the island of Skyros, Greece. Her eight crew were rescued by a Hellenic Coast Guard helicopter.

=== 18 February ===
List of shipwrecks: 18 February 2012
Ship	State	Description
Hg Xin Yuan Shun 6	China	The cargo ship foundered off Hui'an with the loss of ten of her eleven crew.
Oberon	Russia	The tanker ranaground at Penghu, Taiwan. All sixteen crew were rescued by a Taiwan Coast Guard helicopter.

=== 19 February ===
List of shipwrecks: 19 February 2012
Ship	State	Description
Fadak 150	Iran	The tug was destroyed by fire in the Persian Gulf. Her nine crew were rescued.

=== 22 February ===
List of shipwrecks: 22 February 2012
Ship	State	Description
Commando	Netherlands	The tug capsized and sank at Krimpen aan den IJssel, South Holland. Both crew were rescued by Gepke (Netherlands).

=== 23 February ===
List of shipwrecks: 23 February 2012
Ship	State	Description
Family Union	Spain	The fishing vessel sank off Vélez-Málaga in Spain after it sprung a leak; the crew was rescued.

=== 24 February ===
List of shipwrecks: 24 February 2012
Ship	State	Description
Miss Pearl	United States	The crew vessel ran aground near Houston, Texas. Her four crew were rescued.

=== 27 February ===
List of shipwrecks: 27 February 2012
Ship	State	Description
MSC Carole	Panama	The container ship ran aground on a reef off Jakarta, Indonesia.

=== 28 February ===
List of shipwrecks: 28 February 2012
Ship	State	Description
Inzhener Nazarov	Russia	The tanker caught fire in the Caspian Sea off Makhachkala and was abandoned with the loss of one of her fourteen crew.

=== 29 February ===
List of shipwrecks: 29 February 2012
Ship	State	Description
Tra Ly 18	Vietnam	The coaster foundered in the Gulf of Tonkin off Vinh. Her crew were rescued by Hoang Vu 1 (Vietnam).

== March ==
=== 2 March ===
List of shipwrecks: 2 March 2012
Ship	State	Description
Bo Yun 018	China	The coaster collided with Dream Diva (Panama) and sank in the Pearl River Delta off Zhuhai with the loss of eight of her ten crew.
Cyclone	United States	The fishing vessel sank 6 nautical miles (11 km; 6.9 mi) east of Cape Chiniak (57°37′N 152°10′W) on the coast of Alaska's Kodiak Island after her lazarette flooded. Her crew of three abandoned ship wearing survival suits and was rescued by the fishing vessel Glacier (United States).
Governor Herbert H. Lehman	United States	The ferry sprang a leak and sank at Newburgh, New York.

=== 5 March ===
List of shipwrecks: 5 March 2012
Ship	State	Description
Alfa 1	Greece	The tanker capsized and sank, possibly after hitting a shipwreck west of Athens. Ten crew were rescued and one person, the captain, died.

=== 7 March ===
List of shipwrecks: 7 March 2012
Ship	State	Description
Cebu Ferry 1	Philippines	The ferry caught fire off Matuko Point. All 43 passengers were taken off by Supercat 38 (Philippines). Cebu Ferry 1 was later towed in to Batangas.
Stena Feronia	Sweden	The ferry collided in Belfast Lough, Northern Ireland with Union Moon (Cook Islands.

=== 9 March ===
List of shipwrecks: 9 March 2012
Ship	State	Description
Algoma Discovery	Canada	The bulk carrier caught fire and nearly sank while at port in Hamilton, Ontario.
Celina	Antigua and Barbuda	The container ship ran aground off Måløy, Norway and was severely damaged. Twelve of her fourteen crew were taken off, the other two remaining on board to assist with salvage efforts.

=== 10 March ===
List of shipwrecks: 10 March 2012
Ship	State	Description
Chevelle	United States	The fishing vessel ran aground at Newport, Oregon in high wind.
Gelso M	Italy	Wreck of MV Gelso M The chemical tanker ran aground off Syracuse, Sicily. All nineteen crew were rescued by helicopter.
Seagate	United Kingdom	The bulk carrier was in collision with the refrigerated cargo ship Timor Stream (Liberia 24 nautical miles (44 km) north of Manzanillo, Dominican Republic. Seagate was extensively damaged and was declared a constructive total loss.

=== 13 March ===
List of shipwrecks: 13 March 2012
Ship	State	Description
Kenos Athena	South Korea	The tanker capsized and foundered off Guangdong, China. Her eighteen crew were rescued.
Shariatpur 1	Bangladesh	The ferry sank about 50 kilometres (27 nmi) south of the capital Dhaka after hitting an oil barge. The death toll early the next morning stood at 110 killed and at least 61 missing.
Yuan Tong	Panama	The cargo ship foundered off Zhoushan, China with the loss of eight of her 40 crew.

=== 14 March ===
List of shipwrecks: 14 March 2012
Ship	State	Description
TG 6715	Vietnam	The tug was struck by a barge and sank in the Dong Nai River at Bien Hoa with the loss of a crew member.

=== 15 March ===
List of shipwrecks: 15 March 2012
Ship	State	Description
Bareli	Singapore	The container ship ran aground in the East China Sea 2 nautical miles (3.7 km) off Fuqing, China and broke in two. All 21 crew were rescued.
Stolt Valor	Hong Kong	An explosion and subsequent fire onboard the chemical tanker killed one crewman. The ship was later declared total loss and sold for scrapping.
Tong Chang Qi Du 11	China	The ferry collided with Shun Qiang 28 (China in the Yangtze River and sank with the loss of two lives.

=== 19 March ===
List of shipwrecks: 19 March 2012
Ship	State	Description
Ocean Glory	Taiwan	The cargo ship capsized and sank off Keelung with the loss of eight of her fifteen crew.

=== 27 March ===
List of shipwrecks: 27 March 2012
Ship	State	Description
Patrice McAllister	Canada	The tugboat caught fire off the coast of Kingston, Ontario in Lake Ontario.

== April ==
=== 1 April ===
List of shipwrecks: 1 April 2012
Ship	State	Description
Chabira	Lithuania	The dredger sprang a leak and sank at Klaipėda.

=== 3 April ===
List of shipwrecks: 3 April 2012
Ship	State	Description
Ara Felixtowe	Cyprus	The cargo ship suffered a fire in her engine room. All nine crew were rescued by a KNRM lifeboat. The fire was extinguished and her crew returned to the ship, which was towed in to Harlingen, Netherlands.
Carrier	Antigua and Barbuda	Carrier The coaster ran aground at Llanddulas, United Kingdom. All seven crew were rescued. She was declared a constructive total loss and was consequently scrapped in situ.
New Lucky VII	Hong Kong	The cargo ship foundered in the East China Sea off the Amami Island, Japan with the loss of six of her seventeen crew.

=== 4 April ===
List of shipwrecks: 4 April 2012
Ship	State	Description
Sea Flower	Haiti	The ro-ro cargo ship was destroyed by fire at Miragoane.

=== 5 April ===
List of shipwrecks: 5 April 2012
Ship	State	Description
Ryō Un Maru	Japan	Ryō Un Maru 2011 Tōhoku earthquake and tsunami: The derelict fishing vessel, which had been drifting in the Pacific Ocean for over a year, was shelled and sunk 195 nautical miles (361 km) off Sitka, Alaska, United States by the cutter USCGC Anacapa ( United States Coast Guard).

=== 10 April ===
List of shipwrecks: 10 April 2012
Ship	State	Description
Truong Hai Star	Vietnam	The cargo ship collided with Krairatch Dignity (Thailand) off Vung Tau and sank. Her sixteen crew were rescued.

=== 23 April ===
List of shipwrecks: 23 April 2012
Ship	State	Description
Aquarius	United Kingdom	The tug sank 45 miles (72 km) off the Lizard with one of the three crew reported missing.

=== 30 April ===
List of shipwrecks: 30 April 2012
Ship	State	Description
Unnamed ferry	India	2012 Assam ferry sinking: The ferry capsized in the Brahmaputra River in the Dhubri district of Assam state in northeastern India; more than 100 bodies were recovered.

== May ==
=== 2 May ===
List of shipwrecks: 2 May 2012
Ship	State	Description
FR8 Pride	Marshall Islands	The tanker collided with the oil rig Rowan EXL-1 in the Gulf of Mexico and was holed. She was beached near Corpus Christi, Texas.

=== 3 May ===
List of shipwrecks: 3 May 2012
Ship	State	Description
Urd	Denmark	The ro-ro ferry was struck by Nils Holgersson (Germany) at Travemünde, Germany and sank by the bow until it grounded.

=== 4 May ===
List of shipwrecks: 4 May 2012
Ship	State	Description
Igloo	United States	The 14-gross ton, 38.3-foot (11.7 m) salmon troller ran aground near Sitka Rocky Gutierrez Airport in Sitka, Alaska. Her two crewmen were rescued. Several days later, Igloo sank in 50 feet (15 m) of water 200 yards (180 m) off Cannon Island in Sitka while under tow to a safe location for dismantling.

=== 12 May ===
List of shipwrecks: 12 May 2012
Ship	State	Description
Eihatsu Maru	Japan	The fishing vessel was driven ashore at Cape Town, South Africa. Nineteen of her 28 crew were evacuated by the NSRI.

=== 18 May ===
List of shipwrecks: 18 May 2012
Ship	State	Description
Purbeck Isle	United Kingdom	The wreck of the fishing vessel was found one day after she went missing ten miles off Portland, England in 50 m. One body recovered and two missing.

=== 19 May ===
List of shipwrecks: 19 May 2012
Ship	State	Description
Erol Senkaya	Turkey	The cargo ship sank in the Ionian Sea between Zakynthos and the Greek mainland with the loss of four of her ten crew.

=== 23 May ===
List of shipwrecks: 23 May 2012
Ship	State	Description
Solfish 001	Solomon Islands	The inter-island cargo ship sank for unknown reasons near the Solomon Islands. All on board were rescued from life rafts several days later.

=== 26 May ===
List of shipwrecks: 26 May 2012
Ship	State	Description
Kapitan Bolsunovskiy	Russia	The fishing trawler was holed by ice in the Bering Sea and foundered off Dezhnev Point. Her 90 crew were rescued by Derzu Uzala (Russia).

=== 29 May ===
List of shipwrecks: 29 May 2012
Ship	State	Description
Jing Huai 188	China	The coaster foundered off Shanghai with the loss of at least three lives. Two survivors were rescued.

== June ==
=== 25 June ===
List of shipwrecks: 25 June 2012
Ship	State	Description
Flash		grounded at Galite Islands, Tunisia, later laid up until 2017. In 2017 scrapped in Aliaga

== July ==
=== 2 July ===
List of shipwrecks: 2 July 2012
Ship	State	Description
USCGC Mohawk	United States Coast Guard	The museum ship, a decommissioned Algonquin-class cutter, was sunk as an artificial reef in the Gulf of Mexico 28 nautical miles (32 mi; 52 km) off Captiva Island, Florida.

=== 12 July ===
List of shipwrecks: 12 July 2012
Ship	State	Description
HYSY 699	China	Typhoon Vicente: The ship sank off Hong Kong. Her crew was rescued.

=== 14 July ===
List of shipwrecks: 14 July 2012
Ship	State	Description
MSC Flaminia	Germany	The damaged MSC Flaminia The container ship suffered an onboard explosion and fire in the Atlantic Ocean (47°52′N 30°44′W) with the loss of two of her crew of 23. Survivors abandoned ship and were rescued by DS Crown (Bahamas).
USNS Niagara Falls	United States Navy	USNS Niagara Falls sinking. The inactivated Mars-class combat stores ship was sunk as a target in the Pacific Ocean 63 nautical miles (72 mi; 117 km) southwest of Kauai, Hawaii, during the RIMPAC 2012 exercise.

=== 17 July ===
List of shipwrecks: 17 July 2012
Ship	State	Description
USNS Concord	United States Navy	The inactivated Mars-class combat stores ship was sunk as a target in the Pacific Ocean 61 nautical miles (70 mi; 113 km) off the coast of Kauai, Hawaii, by a Mark 48 torpedo fired by the submarine HMCS Victoria (Royal Canadian Navy) during the RIMPAC 2012 exercise.

=== 18 July ===
List of shipwrecks: 18 July 2012
Ship	State	Description
Skagit	Tanzania	The ferry sank in the Indian Ocean off Zanzibar with great loss of life. Only 145 of the 280 people on board were reported to have been rescued as of 23 July, with 78 bodies recovered.

== August ==
=== 2 August ===
List of shipwrecks: 2 August 2012
Ship	State	Description
Evening Star	United States	The 35-gross ton, 50-foot (15.2 m) purse-seine fishing vessel capsized and sank in Slocum Arm (57°34′N 136°03′W) in Southeast Alaska just after hauling a large set of pink salmon aboard, dumping four members of her five-person crew into the water. They were picked up by the fifth crewmen, who was operating her seine skiff, and all five then were rescued from the skiff by the fishing vessel El Dorado (United States).

=== 8 August ===
List of shipwrecks: 8 August 2012
Ship	State	Description
Chamarel	Mauritius	The cable ship was destroyed by fire off Walvis Bay, Namibia.

=== 16 August ===
List of shipwrecks: 16 August 2012
Ship	State	Description
Ocean Breeze	Hong Kong	The bulk carrier was driven ashore at Llolleo, Chile. She was declared a constructive total loss.

=== 26 August ===
List of shipwrecks: 26 August 2012
Ship	State	Description
Hansa Berlin	Liberia	The container ship was grounded off the coast of Mariel, Cuba, due to engine failure and heavy seas from Hurricane Isaac.

=== 28 August ===
List of shipwrecks: 28 August 2012
Ship	State	Description
Pacific Carrier	South Korea	The bulk carrier broke in two after breaking her moorings and drifting to the shore near Sacheon, South Korea. The ship had been struck by another vessel eight months earlier and was awaiting for repairs. The ship was declared constructive total loss and scrapped in situ.

=== 30 August ===
List of shipwrecks: 30 August 2012
Ship	State	Description
Two unidentified barges	United States	The two retired 50-foot (15.2 m) barges were scuttled in the North Atlantic Ocean 2 nautical miles (3.7 km; 2.3 mi) off Mantoloking, New Jersey, in 80 feet (24 m) of water at 40°03.585′N 073°59.391′W both to serve as an artificial reef and as a means of delivering a 47-foot (14.3 m) sculpture of a horseshoe crab intended to lie on the seafloor as part of the reef. Bridles holding the sculpture to the barges broke as the barges sank, causing the sculpture to fall off the barges, hit the seafloor first, and shatter, and the pieces of the sculpture were damaged further when the sinking barges landed on top of them. The wrecks of the two barges and the wreckage of the sculpture are known collectively as the "Horseshoe Crab barge."

=== 31 August ===
List of shipwrecks: 31 August 2012
Ship	State	Description
Advantage	United States	The 48.9-or-58-foot (14.9 or 17.7 m) crab and longline fishing vessel capsized and sank in the Gulf of Alaska 14 nautical miles (26 km; 16 mi) southeast of Sitkalidak Island in Alaska's Kodiak Archipelago. One crewman was trapped inside her hull when she sank and was lost. A United States Coast Guard Sikorsky MH-60 Jayhawk helicopter lifted her other three crewmen from her overturned hull, but one of them died soon afterward of respiratory failure and saltwater aspiration.

== September ==
=== 1 September ===
List of shipwrecks: 1 September 2012
Ship	State	Description
Chloe T	United Kingdom	The fishing vessel sank off Start Point, Devon. All five crew were taken off by a helicopter from RNAS Culdrose.

=== 6 September ===
List of shipwrecks: 6 September 2012
Ship	State	Description
Unnamed boat	Unknown	A fishing boat carrying illegal migrants sank after hitting rocks in Baradan Bay off the coast of Turkey, resulting in 61 deaths.

=== 21 September ===
List of shipwrecks: 21 September 2012
Ship	State	Description
Huelin Dispatch	Jersey	The 2,500 DWT cargo vessel ran aground on Pierre au Vraic rocks near Alderney during her maiden voyage. After making temporary repairs to a leak in her stern she made it to Falmouth Docks for further repairs.

=== 24 September ===
List of shipwrecks: 24 September 2012
Ship	State	Description
Kyeema Spirit	Bahamas	The 113,357 DWT oil tanker, ran aground on a shoal to the east of the island of Aegna near Tallinn, Estonia. The 250-metre (820 ft 3 in) tanker was not carrying cargo, but was reportedly leaking bilge water.

=== 25 September ===
List of shipwrecks: 25 September 2012
Ship	State	Description
Everton	Panama	The cargo ship was severely damaged by fire off the coast of South Africa. She was towed into Durban in late October.

=== 26 September ===
List of shipwrecks: 26 September 2012
Ship	State	Description
Bahuga Jaya	Indonesia	The passenger ferry sank after collision with LPG/chemical tanker Norgas Cathinka (Singapore) off Jakarta, Indonesia, resulting in loss of eight lives. Over 200 passengers and crew were rescued. The tanker received minor structural damage, but was not in danger of sinking.

=== 27 September ===
List of shipwrecks: 27 September 2012
Ship	State	Description
Hao Han	China	The cargo ship caught fire in Osaka Bay. Her twelve crew were rescued by the Japanese Coast Guard.

=== 28 September ===
List of shipwrecks: 28 September 2012
Ship	State	Description
BSCE Sunrise	Bahamas	The cargo ship was driven ashore at Valencia, Spain.
Celia	Antigua and Barbuda	Celia The cargo ship was driven ashore at Valencia. She was refloated on 24 October with assistance from Punta Mayor (Spain).

== October ==
=== 1 October ===
List of shipwrecks: 1 October 2012
Ship	State	Description
Lamma IV	Hong Kong	Lamma IV The passenger ferry sank after a collision with another passenger ferry Sea Smooth (Hong Kong), off Lamma Island, Hong Kong, resulting 39 killed and more than 100 injured.

=== 2 October ===
List of shipwrecks: 2 October 2012
Ship	State	Description
Shung Cheng	Taiwan	The cargo ship caught fire in the Gulf of Tonkin with the loss of six lives.
Straumvik	Norway	The cargo ship ran aground at Finnsnes.

=== 4 October ===
List of shipwrecks: 4 October 2012
Ship	State	Description
Mokosika	Norway	The cargo ship ran aground 55 nautical miles (102 km) south of Bergen.

=== 5 October ===
List of shipwrecks: 5 October 2012
Ship	State	Description
Haoda 6	China	The cargo ship caught fire in the Inland Sea of Japan.

=== 14 October ===
List of shipwrecks: 14 October 2012
Ship	State	Description
Sterno	Sweden	The bulk carrier ran aground and was damaged between Nynashamn and Trosa.

=== 20 October ===
List of shipwrecks: 20 October 2012
Ship	State	Description
BG Stone 1	Denmark	The dredger capsized and sank in shallow water with the hull partially above water in the Kattegat off Odense. Her four crew were rescued by helicopter.

=== 21 October ===
List of shipwrecks: 21 October 2012
Ship	State	Description
Wilson Newport	Norway	The cargo ship ran aground at Gios Georgios, Greece. She was on a voyage from Gemlik, Turkey to Antwerp, Belgium. She was refloated on 24 October and taken into Lagrena Bay.

=== 28 October ===
List of shipwrecks: 28 October 2012
Ship	State	Description
Amurskaya	Russia	The cargo ship was presumed to have foundered in the Sea of Okhotsk off the Shantar Islands (54°40′38″N 135°50′30″E). An EPIRB from the vessel was activated. Nine crew perished.

=== 29 October ===
List of shipwrecks: 29 October 2012
Ship	State	Description
Bounty	United States	Bounty The full-rigged ship was abandoned in the Atlantic Ocean 90 nautical miles (170 km) south east of Cape Hatteras, North Carolina. All sixteen crew took to the lifeboats. The ship later sank, two people were reported to be missing.

=== 30 October ===
List of shipwrecks: 30 October 2012
Ship	State	Description
John B. Caddell	United States	John B. Caddell The tanker was driven ashore at Staten Island, New York, by Hurricane Sandy.
NRP Oliveira e Carmo	Portuguese Navy	The decommissioned corvette was scuttled as an artificial reef off Portimão, Portugal.
Saigon Queen	Vietnam	Cyclone Nilam: The cargo ship sank in the Indian Ocean off Sri Lanka. Eighteen of her 22 crew were rescued.
NRP Zambeze	Portuguese Navy	The decommissioned patrol was scuttled as an artificial reef off Portimão, Portugal.

=== 31 October ===
List of shipwrecks: 31 October 2012
Ship	State	Description
Prathiba Cauvery	India	Cyclone Nilam: The chemical tanker was driven ashore at Besant Nagar with the loss of six of her 37 crew. She was refloated on 11 November with assistance from the tug Malavya 21 (India).

== November ==
=== 3 November ===
List of shipwrecks: 3 November 2012
Ship	State	Description
Conmar Cape	Antigua and Barbuda	The cargo ship ran aground off Subic Bay, Philippines. She was on a voyage from Manila, Philippines to Hong Kong. She was refloated between 16 and 18 November.

=== 10 November ===
List of shipwrecks: 10 November 2012
Ship	State	Description
Atoll	Russia	The tug foundered in the Sea of Azov. Her three crew were rescued.

=== 14 November ===
List of shipwrecks: 14 November 2012
Ship	State	Description
Marion Dufresne	France	The research ship ran aground off Possession Island, Crozet Islands.

=== 19 November ===
List of shipwrecks: 19 November 2012
Ship	State	Description
Kriti II	Greece	A fire broke out on the vehicle deck of the ro-ro ferry whilst she was on a voyage from Venice, Italy to Patras. She was evacuated on arrival at Patras. There were no injuries amongst her 87 crew and 113 passengers.

=== 28 November ===
List of shipwrecks: 28 November 2012
Ship	State	Description
Tundra	Cyprus	The bulk carrier ran aground in the Saint Lawrence River. She was on a voyage from Montreal, Quebec to Halifax, Nova Scotia. She was refloated on 5 December and taken into Trois-Rivières, Quebec.

=== 29 November ===
List of shipwrecks: 29 November 2012
Ship	State	Description
Trans Agila	Antigua and Barbuda	The cargo ship ran aground in Kalmar Strait and was in danger of sinking due to flooding of engine room. She was consequently beached on a sandbank. She was refloated on 1 December and towed into Kalmar.

== December ==
=== 4 December ===
List of shipwrecks: 4 December 2012
Ship	State	Description
BBC Adriatic	Germany	The cargo ship was driven ashore at Kilyos, Turkey.
Volgo-Balt 199	Saint Kitts and Nevis	The general cargo ship sank in a storm off the coast of Turkey. Of the crew of 11, four were rescued and one was confirmed dead. Two rescuers were also killed and three others were reported missing when the boat carrying them hit rocks and sank.

=== 5 December ===
List of shipwrecks: 5 December 2012
Ship	State	Description
Baltic Ace	Bahamas	The car carrier and container ship Corvus J (Cyprus) collided in the North Sea some 22 to 27 nautical miles (40 to 50 km) from the port of Rotterdam. As a result, Baltic Ace began taking on water and was sinking as the rescue boats and a helicopter rushed to the scene. Of the crew of 24, five were confirmed dead and six were reported missing, presumed dead while 13 crew members were rescued.

=== 6 December ===
List of shipwrecks: 6 December 2012
Ship	State	Description
Onezkhaya	Russia	The hopper ship sank at Ust-Luga. Her six crew survived.

=== 7 December ===
List of shipwrecks: December 2012
Ship	State	Description
Melody	Russia	The cargo ship ran aground near Krilyon Point, Sakhalin. She was on a voyage from Vladivostok to Korsakov.

=== 11 December ===
List of shipwrecks: 11 December 2012
Ship	State	Description
CSL Tadoussac	Canada	The lake freighter collided with a pier at Toledo, Ohio. The vessel's fuel bunker was pierced, causing a minor oil spill.

=== 14 December ===
List of shipwrecks: 14 December 2012
Ship	State	Description
Equity	United States	The 25-gross ton, 42-foot (12.8 m) troller struck a rock and sank southwest of Heceta Island in the Alexander Archipelago in Southeast Alaska. The fishing vessel High Pockets (United States) rescued her entire crew of three.
Unidentified boat	Turkey	A boat carrying immigrants from Turkey sank in the northeastern Aegean Sea off the Greek island of Lesbos, killing at least 18 people.

=== 18 December ===
List of shipwrecks: 18 December 2012
Ship	State	Description
Unnamed boat	Unknown	A boat carrying migrant workers from Somalia to Yemen sank off the Somali port of Bosaso, killing 55 people.

=== 24 December ===
List of shipwrecks: 24 December 2012
Ship	State	Description
Asian Lily	Panama	The refrigerated cargo ship ran aground on Kwaiawata Island, Marshall Bennett Islands (8°54′S 151°5′E). She was still aground on 4 January 2013.

=== 28 December ===
List of shipwrecks: 28 December 2012
Ship	State	Description
Al-Jasourah	Iran	The ship sank off United Arab Emirates due to rough weather. The all-Iranian crew of six was airlifted to safety.

=== 29 December ===
List of shipwrecks: 29 December 2012
Ship	State	Description
Royal Prime	Vietnam	The cargo ship foundered in the South China Sea off the Spratly Islands. Her eighteen crew survived.

=== 31 December ===
List of shipwrecks: 31 December 2012
Ship	State	Description
Kulluk	Marshall Islands	Kulluk aground on the southeast side of Sitkalidak Island, Alaska, on 1 January 2013. The mobile drilling rig drifted aground near Sitkalidak Island in the Gulf of Alaska after towing lines parted in heavy weather. She was refloated on 8 January 2013.

== Unknown date ==
List of shipwrecks: Unknown date 2012
Ship	State	Description
USS Nashua	United States Navy	Sometime in 2012 the decommissioned Natick-class tugboat was scuttled for United States Navy diving training off Honolulu, Hawaii.
