= MV Shariatpur 1 =

2012 Bangladesh ferry accident
- Munshiganj District: Bangladesh
- Date: March 2012
- Passengers & Crew: ~200
- Fatalities: 147
- Boat Name: MV Shariatpur 1

The MV Shariatpur 1 was a double deck ferry that capsized in March 2012 after colliding with a cargo ship on Bangladesh's Meghna River, killing 147 people.

First reports confirmed 30 people were dead and dozens missing after the ferry which was carrying 200 people collided with a cargo ship. The ferry capsized on the Meghna in the Munshiganj District near the Bangladeshi capital Dhaka and sank in about 70 foot (21 m) of water.

The ferry had been carrying about 200 passengers, although the exact number is uncertain as the ferry was not carrying an accurate passenger list. 35 survivors were pulled from the water, a further 40 swam to shore. In total 112 bodies were recovered from the sunken ship by divers. The boat was recovered for salvage and a further 4 bodies were found floating down river. The rescue operation was called off. After 110 bodies had been recovered a further 61 people remained unaccounted for, but the final death toll was later placed at 147.

== See also ==
- List of shipwrecks in 2012
