= Patrice McAllister (1999) =

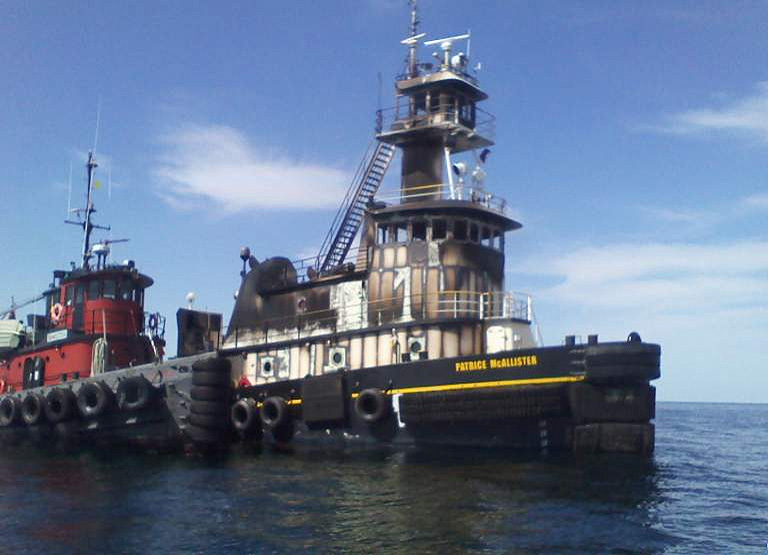
- Patrice McCallister after being towed to harbor by another McCallister tug—note the scorched plates on the bridge.

History
- Name: Patrice McAllister
- Owner: McAllister Towing and Transportation
- Builder: C & G Boat Works
- Yard number: 35
- Launched: 1999
- Identification: IMO number: 9215799; MMSI number: 367516950; Callsign: WDG2567

General characteristics
- Type: Tugboat
- Tonnage: 149 GT; 108 NT
- Length: 105.2 ft (32.1 m)
- Beam: 34 ft (10 m)
- Depth: 15.2 ft (4.6 m)

Patrice McAllister is a US-flagged tugboat operated by McAllister Towing of New York, LLC. The vessel caught fire in Canadian waters, near Kingston, Ontario, on Lake Ontario, while travelling from Toledo, Ohio, en route to Staten Island, New York, on 27 March 2012. The Canadian Coast Guard rescued all six crew members, but her chief engineer died the next day. All of her crew were US citizens. CCGS Cape Hearne and Canadian and American helicopters and aircraft were deployed to help rescue the crew. The vessel remained adrift after the crew were evacuated. A towboat from Clayton, New York salvaged the vessel and towed her to Clayton.

McAllister had operated an earlier vessel of the same name which sank off the coast of New Jersey in 1976.
