= Kirillovka =

Kirillovka Кирилловка
- Village
- Location within Perm Krai Location within Russia
- Coordinates: 56°41′N 54°43′E
- Country: Russia
- Region: Perm Krai
- District: Chaykovsky
- Time zone: UTC+5:00

Kirillovka (Russian: Кирилловка) is a rural locality (a village) in Chaykovsky, Perm Krai, Russia. The population was 138 as of 2010.

== Geography ==
Kirillovka is located 44 km southeast of Chaykovsky. Alnyash is the nearest rural locality.
