= Nashua (YTB-774) =

Tugboat of the United States Navy

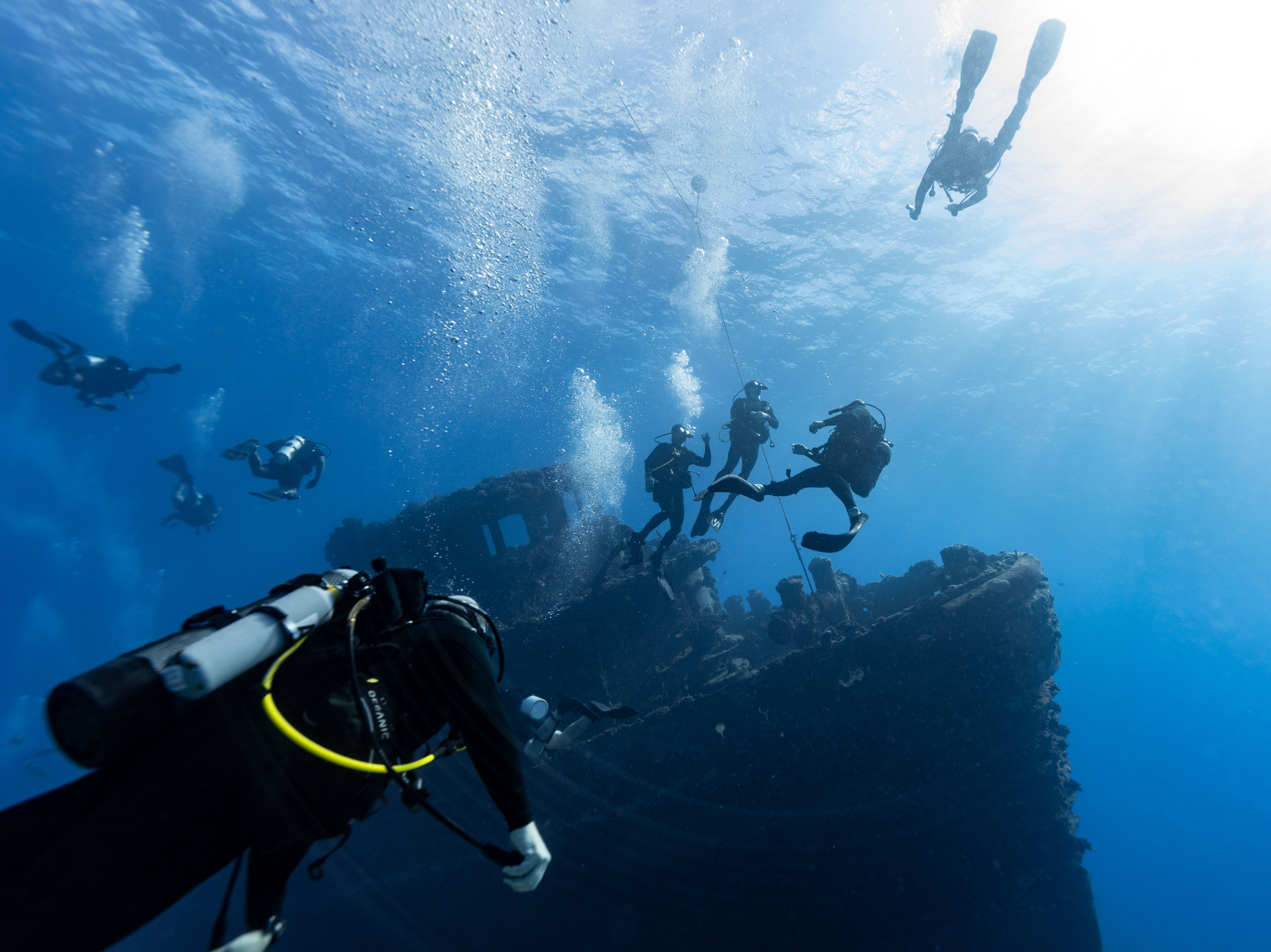
- Divers conduct a training exercise on the wreck of the Nashua in 2022

History

United States
- Awarded: 31 January 1964
- Builder: Marinette Marine, Marinette, Wisconsin
- Laid down: 27 August 1964
- Launched: 11 May 1965
- Acquired: 20 June 1965
- Stricken: 6 May 1994
- Fate: Sunk as Navy training site (2012)

General characteristics
- Class & type: Natick-class Natick-class large harbor tug
- Displacement: 283 long tons (288 t)
- Length: 109 ft (33 m)
- Beam: 31 ft (9.4 m)
- Draft: 14 ft (4.3 m)
- Speed: 12 knots (14 mph; 22 km/h)
- Complement: 12
- Armament: None

Nashua (YTB-774) was a United States Navy Natick-class large harbor tug named for Nashua, New Hampshire.

== Construction ==
The contract for Nashua was awarded 31 January 1964. She was laid down on 27 August 1964 at Marinette, Wisconsin, by Marinette Marine and launched 11 May 1965; placed in service without ceremony 20 June 1965.

== Operational history ==
Nashua was assigned to the Subic Bay Naval Station, Philippines. In addition to providing assistance to other naval ships and craft during berthing and docking evolutions, she also rendered towing and waterfront fire protection services. Nashua was likewise available to serve as an inner harbor patrol craft and to render assistance in emergency and disaster situations.

Nashua was stricken from the Navy Directory 6 May 1994. NVR indicates that ex-Nashua is under the custodial care of Mobile Diving and Salvage Unit One, Pearl Harbor, Hawaii. Another source reports that ex-Nashua was sold. Other sources indicate that in 2012, ex-Nashua was scuttled as a navy training site outside of Hickam Harbor.
