= USCGC Anacapa =

U.S. Coast Guard patrol boat

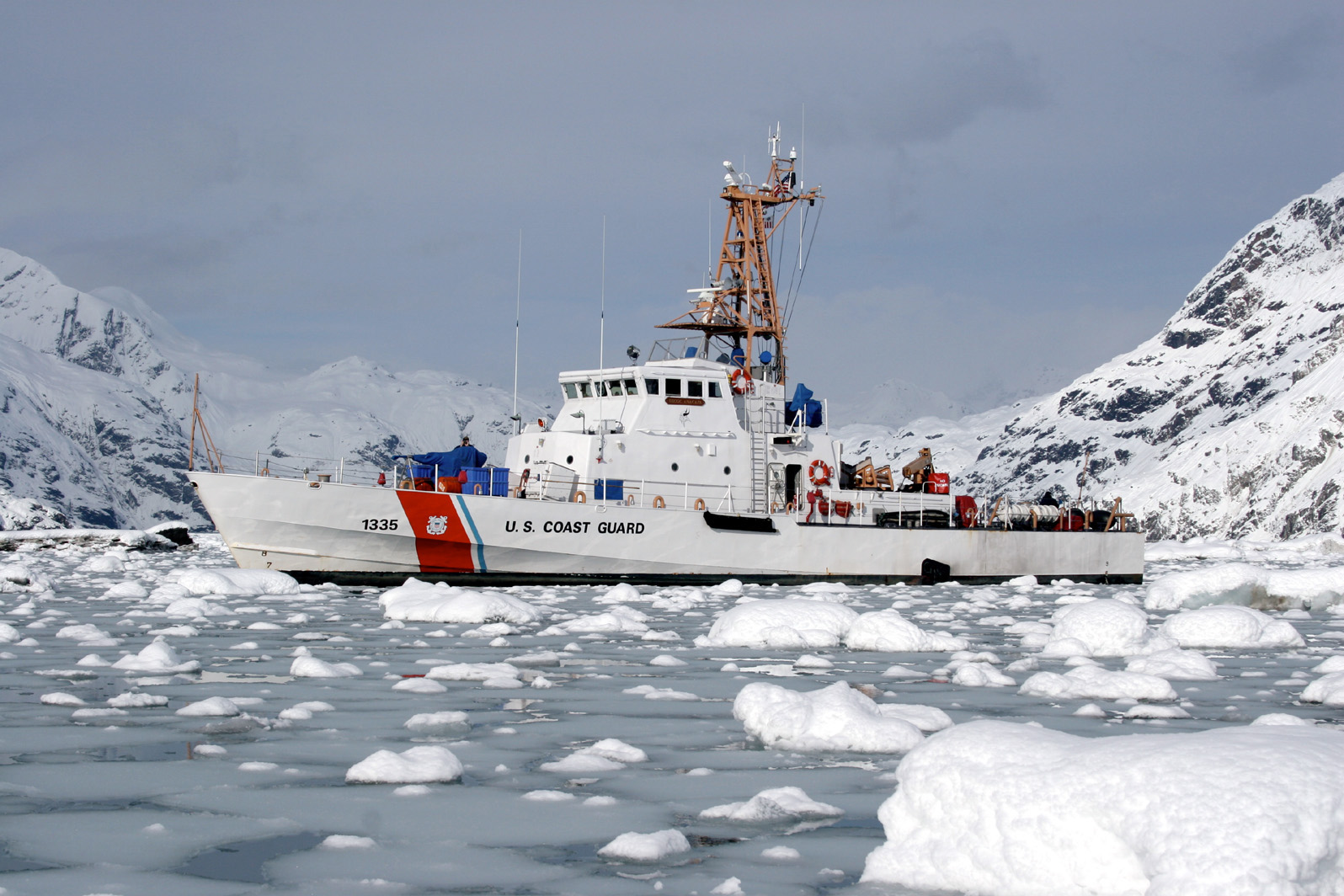
- Anacapa in Glacier Bay, Alaska

History

United States
- Name: USCGC Anacapa
- Namesake: Anacapa Island, California
- Launched: September 8, 1989
- Commissioned: January 13, 1990
- Decommissioned: April 26, 2024
- Home port: Petersburg, Alaska
- Identification: MMSI number: 367947000; Callsign: NEXY
- Status: Decommissioned

General characteristics
- Class & type: Island-class cutter
- Displacement: 155 tons
- Length: 110 ft (34 m)
- Beam: 21 ft (6.4 m)
- Draft: 7 ft (2.1 m)
- Propulsion: Twin Paxman Valenta 16-CM RP-200M
- Speed: 29.6 knots
- Range: 3,380 miles
- Endurance: 5 days
- Complement: 2 officers, 14 enlisted
- Armament: 25 mm Mk 38 chain gun; 5 × .50 caliber machine guns

USCGC Anacapa (WPB-1335) is a decommissioned Island-class cutter of the United States Coast Guard. She was based at Petersburg, Alaska and Port Angeles, Washington and was responsible for law enforcement, search and rescue, and maritime defense.

== Design and characteristics ==
The Island-class patrol boats, including Anacapa, were constructed in Bollinger Shipyards in Lockport, Louisiana. Their design is based on the British Vosper Thornycroft 33 metres (108 ft) patrol boats and have similar dimensions. Anacapa has an overall length of 110 feet (34 m), a beam of 21 feet (6.4 m), and a draft of 7 feet (2.1 m) at full load. The patrol boat has a displacement of 155 tons at full load and 138 tons at half load. Anacapa was launched on September 8, 1989. She was the 35th Island-class vessel completed.

The Coast Guard purchased 49 Island-class cutters, and over the course of their construction made several modifications. The ships are grouped into A, B, and C classes depending on their design. Anacapa is a B-class ship and thus has heavier bow plating to prevent hull cracking in heavy seas, among other enhancements.

Anacapa is powered by two Paxman Valenta 16 CM Diesel engines which drive two 5-blade propellers. She has two 99 kilowatts (135 PS; 133 shp) Caterpillar 3304T diesel generators for electrical power. Her hull is constructed of high-strength steel, and her superstructure and main deck are constructed of aluminium. Stern flaps were retrofitted to reduce hull friction, and increase speed and full efficiency. Anacapa has active fin stabilizers to improve her seakeeping characteristics.

The Island-class patrol boats have maximum sustained speeds of 29.6 knots (54.8 km/h; 34.1 mph). They are fitted with one 25mm machine gun and two Browning .50 Caliber Machine Gun. They are equipped with satellite navigation systems, collision avoidance systems, and surface radar. They have a range of 3,380 miles (2,940 nmi; 5,440 km) at 8 knots, and an at-sea endurance of five days.

Anacapa carries one 18-foot rigid hull inflatable boat with seating for 8 crew.

Anacapa's complement is 2 officers and 14 enlisted crew.

Anacapa's namesake is Anacapa Island, one of the Channel Islands off the Southern California coast.

== Operational history ==
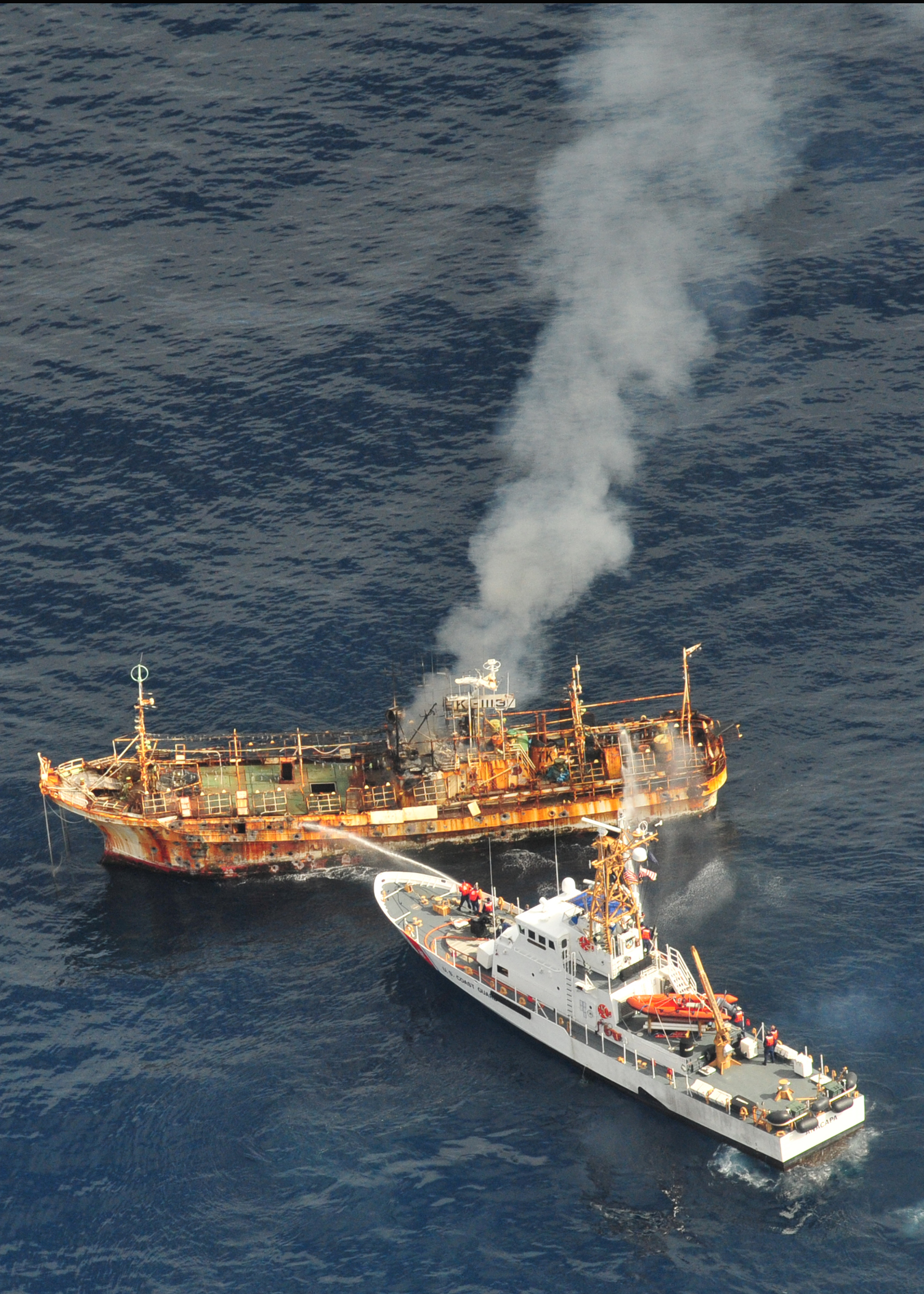
USCGC Anacapa directs streams of water into the Japanese derelict Ryou-Un Maru to sink it after shelling it. Holes from the Mk 38 25 mm chain gun are clearly visible on the bow of the derelict.

=== Petersburg ===
The Anacapa was homeported in Petersburg, Alaska for most of her career. She was commissioned there on January 13, 1990. She replaced USCGC Cape Hatteras at that station. Anacapa's primary missions were law enforcement, including safety and fisheries laws, search and rescue, and maritime defense operations. The ship's law enforcement duties included policing the international border with Canada. The United States and Canada disagree on the location of the maritime border in Dixon Entrance. This led to a series of seizures of Canadian fishing boats by Anacapa in the disputed waters. Western Eagle was fishing 300 yards into U.S. waters when she was seized on July 15, 1991. The troller Barbarella was seized 800 yards north of the border claimed by the U.S. on July 14, 1991. A 1990 agreement between the two countries reduced fishing conflicts when it became effective in 1992. Nonetheless, patrols of the disputed waters continued and on June 22, 1995 Anacapa seized the Canadian fishing vessel Chi Dona 300 yards north of the border.

Anacapa also enforced fishing, safety, and other regulations on U.S.-flagged vessels. On August 11, 1993 a boarding party from Anacapa removed 15 illegal immigrants working aboard the fish processing ship Ocean Pride. She conducted routine safety inspections of vessels in her patrol area. In the summer of 2018, for instance, Anacapa's boardings found three vessels in violation of various regulations.

Anacapa's search and rescue missions frequently involved the sizable local fishing fleet. For example, on May 8, 1992 Anacapa towed the fishing vessel Justy back to Petersburg with a malfunctioning propeller shaft. The next day she towed the disabled fishing vessel Sirius to Petersburg with a bad oil pump. In July 1996 Anacapa rescued the four-man crew of the capsized fishing vessel Baranof Queen. While assisting the local fishing fleet may have been the norm, Anacapa participated in a wide range of search and rescue missions. For example, on January 20, 1990, a week after her commissioning, Anacapa responded when the Canadian tanker Frank H. Brown went aground in Wrangell Narrows and spilled 57,600 gallons of gasoline into the waterway.

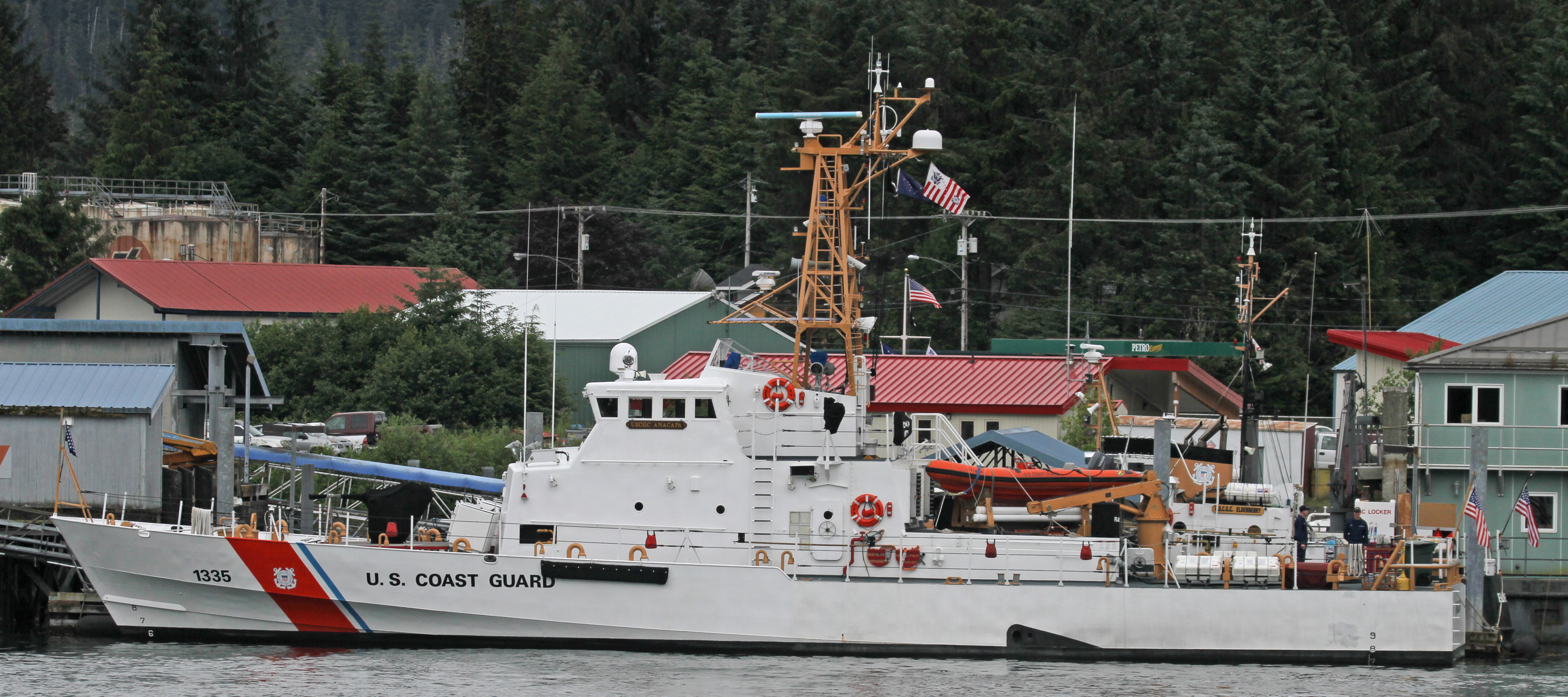
USCGC Anacapa in 2011

In December 2008 Anacapa sailed to the Coast Guard Yard in Curtis Bay, Maryland for a major renovation under the Mission Effectiveness Program. The renovation was intended to extend the service life of the cutter. Significant portions of corroded hull plating, air-conditioning, water makers, and fire systems were replaced, and a number of major systems, including main engine control, were upgraded. The cost of the upgrade was between $7 and $9 million.

On May 31, 2011, Lieutenant Matthias Wholley was relieved of command of the Anacapa six weeks ahead of schedule. On June 30, 2011, the Coast Guard announced that an investigation had confirmed Wholley had been intoxicated while on duty. Wholley received a letter of reprimand, 60-day restriction, and forfeiture of half months pay for two months.

On April 5, 2012, the Anacapa intercepted the derelict 165-foot (50 m) Japanese squid fishing boat Ryou-Un Maru in the Gulf of Alaska 180 miles (290 km) off the coast of Southeast Alaska. It had been washed away from its mooring in Aomori Prefecture, Japan by the March 2011 Tōhoku earthquake and tsunami and had drifted, unmanned for more than a year across the Pacific Ocean. The Coast Guard concluded that it was safer to sink it deep water rather than let it continue to drift and possibly become a hazard to navigation or the environment. The Anacapa fired on the ghost ship with her Mk 38 25mm autocannon, holing it and eventually sinking it with fire hoses in approximately 1,800-metre (6,000 ft) of water.

=== Port Angeles ===
Anacapa left Petersburg for the last time on May 5, 2022. After a shipyard repair period in Ketchikan, she sailed to Port Angeles, Washington to replace her sister ship USCGC Cuttyhunk, which had suffered irreparable hull damage. Anacapa was re-engined with Cuttyhunk's recently overhauled motors at that time.

In August 2022, Anacapa rescued three people from a disabled sailboat and towed the vessel overnight.

On April 15, 2023, the Washington State Ferry MV Walla Walla ran aground on Bainbridge Island in Rich Passage. Anacapa was the Coast Guard cutter sent to the scene. Anacapa cordoned off the area around the grounded ferry and helped evacuate some 600 passengers.

== Decommissioning ==
As early as the mid-2000s, the mechanical reliability of the aging Island-class ships became an issue. The Coast Guard began retiring Island-class cutters in 2012, replacing them with Sentinel-class fast-response cutters or, in the case when Anacapa left Petersburg, by the Marine Protector-Class coastal patrol boat USCGC Pike. Anacapa was decommissioned on April 26, 2024 in Port Angeles. At that time, the Coast Guard's intention was to sail the decommissioned cutter to the Coast Guard Yard in Baltimore, Maryland and place her in the Cutter Transition Division. There, Anacapa would likely be prepared for sale to another country or scavenged for parts.

Anacapa earned the Coast Guard Meritorious Unit Commendation for her work between May 20, 1996 and May 20, 1997 and the Special Operations Service Ribbon for her participation in Arctic Shield 2013.
