= Patrice McAllister (1919) =

- Patrice McAllister

History
- Name: Patrice McAllister
- Builder: Johnson Iron Works
- Yard number: 135
- Launched: 1919
- Fate: Sank off the coast of New Jersey 1976

General characteristics
- Type: Tugboat
- Length: 94 ft (29 m)

Patrice McAllister was a United States-flagged tugboat launched in 1919. She sank in 1976 while being towed to a shipyard in Jersey City, New Jersey to have her engine replaced. The vessel was 94 feet (29 m) long. Her wreck rests upright, in 55 feet (17 m) of water. The wreck is currently visited by recreational divers.
