= MV FAS Provence =

History
- Name: FAS Provence
- Port of registry: Bahamas
- Builder: Rickmers Reismühlen
- Yard number: 421
- Launched: 1986
- Identification: IMO number: 8508436
- Fate: Sunk on 13 January 2012

General characteristics
- Type: Cargo ship
- Tonnage: 6,071 GT; 8,050 DWT
- Length: 130 m (430 ft) LOA
- Beam: 20 m (66 ft)
- Propulsion: 1 diesel engine
- Speed: 16 knots

MV FAS Provence was a cargo ship that sank in January 2012 off the coast of Malta.

She was built in 1986 by Rickmers Reismühlen in Bremerhaven, Germany as MV Britta Thien, and sailed under the German flag for two years. She did not operate between 1988 and 1997, when she was renamed and reflagged as a Bahamian ship. She sank on 13 January 2012, about 80 miles (130 km) offshore from Fort Delimara, during a storm in the Mediterranean Sea while unmanned and under tow. At the time of her sinking, she was operated by Döhle (IOM) Ltd.

FAS Provence had a gross tonnage of 6,071 and a deadweight tonnage of 8,050 tonnes. She measured 129.6 metres (425 ft) in length and had a beam of 20.1 metres (66 ft). She was powered by a single diesel engine, and had a speed of sixteen knots.
