= Ryou-Un Maru =

Abandoned Japanese fishing vessel sunk in Alaska

Coordinates: 55°01′N 138°48′W

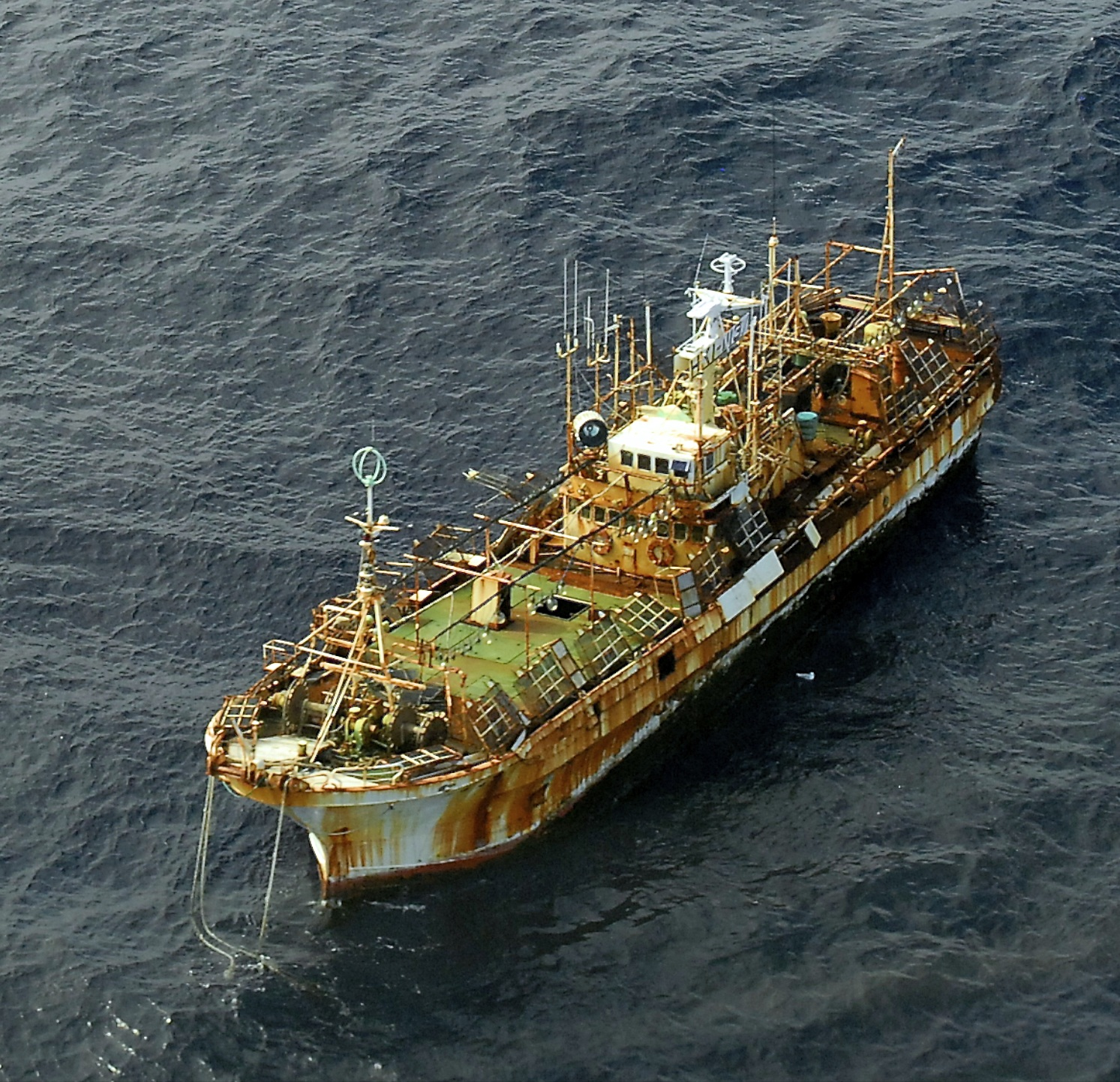
- Ryou-Un Maru adrift near Alaska, 4 April 2012

History

Japan
- Name: Ryou-Un Maru
- Port of registry: Japan
- Launched: c. 1982
- Out of service: March 2011
- Fate: Damaged and sent adrift by tsunami in Japan, later sunk by naval artillery in Alaska

General characteristics
- Type: Squid fishing boat
- Tonnage: 150 tons
- Length: 45 m (148 ft)
- Propulsion: motor (diesel)

Ryou-Un Maru (漁運丸; Fishing Luck) (also Ryō Un Maru) was a Japanese fishing boat that was washed away from its mooring in Aomori Prefecture by the March 2011 Tōhoku earthquake and tsunami and drifted across the Pacific Ocean. It was spotted a year later by a routine Royal Canadian Air Force air patrol about 150 nautical miles (280 km; 170 mi) off the coast of Haida Gwaii, British Columbia. The unmanned hulk entered U.S. waters on 1 April 2012, and, after salvage attempts failed, was sunk by the U.S. Coast Guard on 5 April 2012 to prevent the hulk from becoming a hazard to navigation.

== History ==
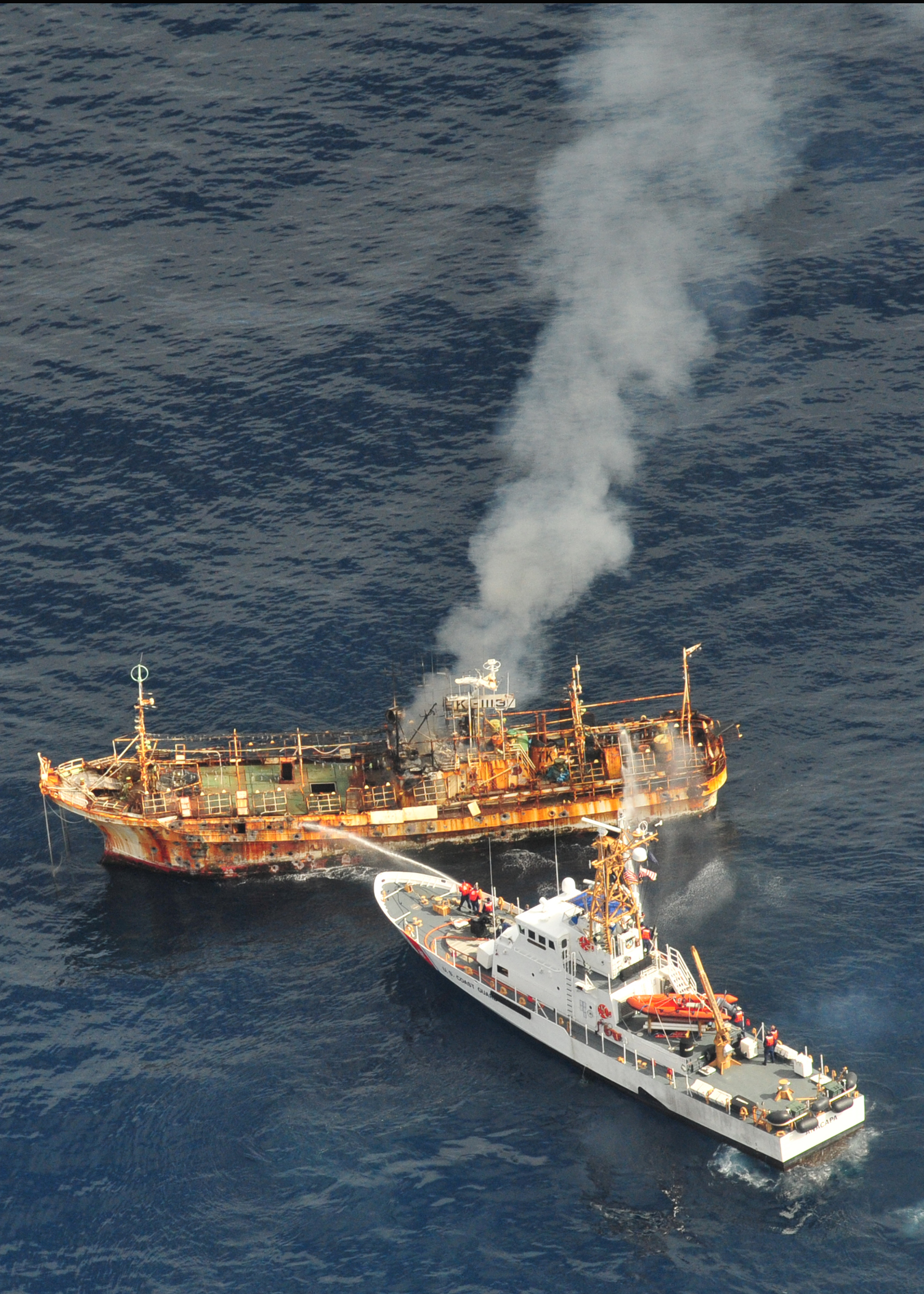
The USCG directs streams of water at the Japanese vessel in Gulf of Alaska after it was shelled by the Anacapa. Holes from the shelling are clearly visible in the side of the fishing boat.

The Ryou-Un Maru, a fishing vessel in the Japanese merchant fleet, was originally built around 1982. It was owned by a Hokkaido-based fishing company and was used for shrimping or squidding. After a long service career the ship's owner decided it was too old for continued use and moored it in Aomori Prefecture in Honshu pending sale. When the Tōhoku earthquake and tsunami struck in March 2011, Ryou-Un Maru broke free and was set adrift.

Like most countries, Japanese law requires a ship be disposed of or dismantled properly before allowing its registration to be canceled. However, all parties assumed the vessel sank in the disaster, so the Japan Coast Guard granted the owner an exception.

For over a year the Ryou-Un Maru drifted across the Pacific as a ghost ship and was carried eastward by the Kuroshio Current. On 20 March 2012, it was spotted in Canadian waters by Royal Canadian Air Force CP-140 Aurora aircraft. As its registration had been canceled, the ship no longer had a legal owner responsible for it. On 4 April 2012, the U.S. Coast Guard dropped a tracking buoy aboard as the vessel drifted approximately 170 nautical miles (310 km; 200 mi) southwest of Sitka, Alaska. The next day, the crew of the U.S. Coast Guard Cutter Anacapa assessed the ship's condition.

Video of the sinking of the Ryou-Un Maru

On 5 April 2012, the Canadian fishing vessel Bernice C attempted to salvage the stricken vessel, but a ruptured fuel tank proved impossible to pump out and a tow failed. The U.S. Coast Guard then determined that sinking the abandoned vessel was necessary to prevent it running aground or becoming a hazard to navigation. USCGC Anacapa fired upon it with a Mk 38 25mm autocannon, holing and sinking the Ryou-Un Maru in approximately 1,800-metre (6,000 ft) of water in the Gulf of Alaska 180 miles (290 km) off the coast of the Alaskan Panhandle.
