= List of toucans =

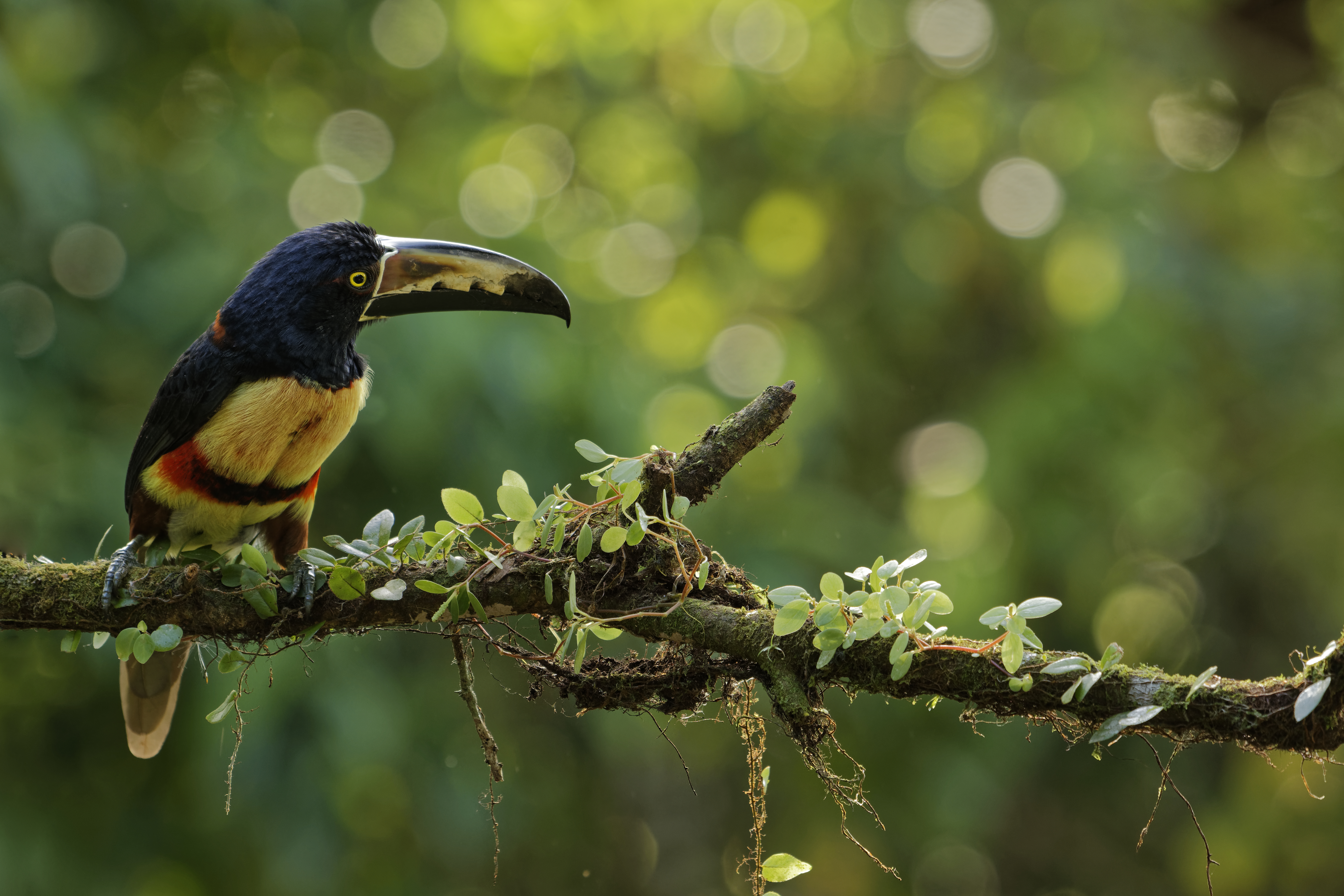
A collared aracari (Pteroglossus torquatus) in Costa Rica

Toucans are birds in the family Ramphastidae in the order Piciformes. There are currently 43 extant species of toucans in 5 genera recognised by the International Ornithologists' Union.

== Conventions ==
IUCN Red List categories
Conservation status
- EX: Extinct (0 species)
- EW: Extinct in the wild (0 species)
- CR: Critically endangered (0 species)
- EN: Endangered (1 species)
- VU: Vulnerable (0 species)
- NT: Near threatened (5 species)
- LC: Least concern (28 species)

Conservation status codes listed follow the International Union for Conservation of Nature (IUCN) Red List of Threatened Species. Range maps are provided wherever possible; if a range map is not available, a description of the toucan's range is provided. Ranges are based on the IOC World Bird List for that species unless otherwise noted. Population estimates are of the number of mature individuals and are taken from the IUCN Red List.

This list follows the taxonomic treatment (designation and order of species) and nomenclature (scientific and common names) of version 13.2 of the IOC World Bird List. Where the taxonomy proposed by the IOC World Bird List conflicts with the taxonomy followed by the IUCN (Note: The IUCN follows the taxonomy proposed by the HBW and BirdLife Taxonomic Checklist.) or the 2023 edition of The Clements Checklist of Birds of the World, the disagreement is noted next to the species's common name (for nomenclatural disagreements) or scientific name (for taxonomic disagreements).

== Classification ==
The International Ornithologists' Union (IOU) recognises 43 species of toucans in 5 genera. This list does not include hybrid species, extinct prehistoric species, or putative species not yet accepted by the IOU.

Family Ramphastidae

- Genus Aulacorhynchus: eleven species
- Genus Pteroglossus: fourteen species
- Genus Selenidera: six species
- Genus Andigena: four species
- Genus Ramphastos: eight species

== Toucans ==
Genus Aulacorhynchus – Gould, 1835 – 11 species
Common name	Scientific name and subspecies	Range	IUCN status and estimated population
Wagler's toucanet	A. wagleri (Note: The Clements Checklist treats the Wagler's, emerald, and blue-throated toucanets as a one species, the northern emerald-toucanet.) (Sturm, J. H. C. F., & Sturm, J. W., 1841)	Southwestern Mexico	LC Unknown
Emerald toucanet	A. prasinus (Gould, 1833) Four subspecies: A. p. warneri; A. p. prasinus; A. p. virescens; A. p. volcanius	Eastern Mexico to Nicaragua	LC Unknown
Blue-throated toucanet	A. caeruleogularis Gould, 1853 Two subspecies: A. c. caeruleogularis; A. c. cognatus	Costa Rica to northwestern Colombia	LC Unknown
White-throated toucanet (Note: Called greyish-throated toucanet by the IUCN.)	A. albivitta (Note: The Clements Checklist treats the white-throated and black-throated toucanets as a one species, the southern emerald-toucanet.) (Boissonneau, 1840) Four subspecies: A. a. lautus; A. a. griseigularis; A. a. phaeolaemus; A. a. albivitta	Colombia, western Venezuela and eastern Ecuador	LC Unknown
Black-throated toucanet	A. atrogularis (Note: The IUCN splits the black-throated toucanet sensu lato into two species, the black-billed toucanet (A. cyanolaemus) and black-throated toucanet sensu stricto (A. atrogularis).) (Sturm, J. H. C. F. & Sturm, J. W., 1841) Four subspecies: A. a. cyanolaemus; A. a. dimidiatus; A. a. atrogularis	Central Ecuador to western Bolivia	NE Unknown
Groove-billed toucanet	A. sulcatus (Note: The IUCN splits the groove-billed toucanet sensu lato into two species, the yellow-billed toucanet (A. calorhynchus) and groove-billed toucanet sensu stricto (A. sulcatus).) (Sturm, J. H. C. F. & Sturm, J. W., 1841) Three subspecies: A. s. sulcatus; A. s. erythrognathus; A. s. calorhynchus	Northeastern Colombia and northern Venezuela	NE Unknown
Chestnut-tipped toucanet	A. derbianus Gould, 1835	Southeastern Colombia to central Bolivia	LC Unknown
Tepui toucanet	A. whitelianus Salvin & Godman, 1882 Three subspecies: A. w. duidae; A. w. whitelianus; A. w. osgoodi	Southern Venezuela and southern Guyana	LC Unknown
Crimson-rumped toucanet	A. haematopygus (Gould, 1835) Two subspecies: A. h. haematopygus; A. h. sexnotatus	Western Venezuela to eastern Ecuador	LC Unknown
Yellow-browed toucanet	A. huallagae Carriker, 1933	Northern Peru	NT 2,500–9,999
Blue-banded toucanet	A. coeruleicinctis D'Orbigny, 1840	Central Peru to southeastern Bolivia	LC Unknown

Genus Pteroglossus – Illiger, 1811 – 14 species
Common name	Scientific name and subspecies	Range	IUCN status and estimated population
Green aracari	P. viridis (Linnaeus, 1766)	Northeastern Amazon rainforest	LC Unknown
Lettered aracari	P. inscriptus (Note: The IUCN splits the lettered aracari sensu lato into two species, the Humboldt's aracari (P. humboldti) and lettered aracari sensu stricto (P. inscriptus).); Swainson, 1822 Two subspecies: P. i. inscriptus; P. i. humboldti	Western and southern Amazon rainforest	NE Unknown
Red-necked aracari	P. bitorquatus (Note: The IUCN splits the red-necked aracari into two species, the western red-necked aracari (P. sturmii) and eastern red-necked aracari (P. bitorquatus).); Vigors, 1826 Three subspecies: P. b. sturmii; P. b. reichenowi; P. b. bitorquatus	Southern Amazon rainforest	NE Unknown
Ivory-billed aracari	P. azara (Note: The Clements Checklist and IUCN treat the brown-billed aracari as a subspecies of the ivory-billed aracari.); Vieillot, 1819 Two subspecies: P. a. flavirostris; P. a. azara	Northwestern Amazon rainforest	NE Unknown
Brown-mandibled aracari	P. mariae Gould, 1854	Southwestern Amazon rainforest	NE Unknown
Black-necked aracari	P. aracari (Linnaeus, 1758) Three subspecies: P. a. atricollis; P. a. aracari; P. a. wiedii	Northeastern and eastern South America	LC Unknown
Chestnut-eared aracari	P. castanotis Gould, 1834 Two subspecies: P. c. castanotis; P. c. australis	Western Amazon rainforest to southeastern Brazil	LC Unknown
Many-banded aracari	P. pluricinctus Gould, 1835	Northwestern Amazon rainforest	LC Unknown
Collared aracari	P. torquatus (Note: The Clements Checklist treats the stripe-billed and pale-billed aracaris as subspecies of the collared aracari.) (Gmelin, J. F., 1788) Three subspecies: P. t. torquatus; P. t. erythrozonus; P. t. nuchalis	Mexico to Venezuela	LC Unknown
Stripe-billed aracari	P. sanguineus Gould, 1854	Western Colombia and northwestern Ecuador	LC Unknown
Pale-mandibled aracari	P. erythropygius Gould, 1843	Western Ecuador	LC Unknown
Fiery-billed aracari	P. frantzii Cabanis, 1861	Costa Rica and Panama	LC 50,000–499,999
Curl-crested aracari	P. beauharnaisii Wagler, 1831	Western Amazon rainforest	LC Unknown
Saffron toucanet	P. bailloni (Vieillot, 1819)	Southeastern Brazil, eastern Paraguay and northeastern Argentina	NT Unknown

Genus Selenidera – Gould, 1837 – 6 species
Common name	Scientific name and subspecies	Range	IUCN status and estimated population
Yellow-eared toucanet	S. spectabilis Cassin, 1858	Honduras to southwestern Colombia	LC 50,000–499,999
Guianan toucanet	S. piperivora (Linnaeus, 1758)	Northeastern Amazon rainforest	LC Unknown
Golden-collared toucanet	S. reinwardtii (Note: The IUCN splits the golden-collared toucanet into two species, the red-billed toucanet (S. reinwardtii) and green-billed toucanet (S. langsdorffii).) (Wagler, 1827) Two subspecies: S. r. reinwardtii; S. r. langsdorffii	Western Amazon rainforest	NE Unknown
Tawny-tufted toucanet	S. nattereri (Gould, 1835)	Northcentral Amazon rainforest	LC Unknown
Gould's toucanet	S. gouldii (Natterer, 1837)	Southern Amazon rainforest	LC Unknown
Spot-billed toucanet	S. maculirostris (Lichtenstein, M. H. C., 1823)	Southeastern Brazil, eastern Paraguay and northeastern Argentina	LC Unknown

Genus Andigena – Gould, 1851 – 4 species
Common name	Scientific name and subspecies	Range	IUCN status and estimated population
Grey-breasted mountain toucan	A. hypoglauca (Gould, 1833) Two subspecies: A. h. hypoglauca; A. h. lateralis	Central Colombia to Peru	NT Unknown
Plate-billed mountain toucan	A. laminirostris Gould, 1851	Southeastern Colombia to southern Ecuador	NT Unknown
Hooded mountain toucan	A. cucullata (Gould, 1846)	Southeastern Peru to central Bolivia	LC Unknown
Black-billed mountain toucan	A. nigrirostris (Waterhouse, 1839) Three subspecies: A. n. occidentalis; A. n. spilorhynchus; A. n. nigrirostris	Western Venezuela to northern Peru	LC Unknown

Genus Ramphastos – Linnaeus, 1758 – 8 species
Common name	Scientific name and subspecies	Range	IUCN status and estimated population
Red-breasted toucan	R. dicolorus (Linnaeus, 1766)	Southeastern Brazil, eastern Paraguay and northeastern Argentina	LC Unknown
Channel-billed toucan	R. vitellinus (Note: The Clements Checklist treats the citron-throated toucan as a subspecies of the channel-billed toucan.) (Note: The IUCN splits the channel-billed toucan sensu lato into three species, the yellow-ridged toucan (R. culminatus), Ariel toucan (R. ariel), and channel-billed toucan sensu stricto (R. vitellinus).); Lichtenstein, M. H. C., 1823 Three subspecies: R. v. culminatus; R. v. vitellinus; R. v. ariel	Amazon rainforest and eastern and southeastern Brazil	NE Unknown
Citron-throated toucan	R. citreolaemus Gould, 1844	Northern Colombia and northwestern Venezuela	LC Unknown
Choco toucan	R. brevis Meyer de Schauensee, 1945	Northwestern Colombia to southwestern Ecuador	LC Unknown
Keel-billed toucan	R. sulfuratus Lesson, R. P., 1830 Two subspecies: R. s. sulfuratus; R. s. brevicarinatus	Eastern Mexico to northwestern Venezuela	NT 50,000–499,999
Toco toucan	R. toco Müller, P. L. S., 1776 Two subspecies: R. t. toco; R. t. albogularis	Northeastern, central, and southeastern South America	LC Unknown
White-throated toucan	R. tucanus (Note: The IUCN splits the white-throated toucan into two species, the red-billed toucan (R. tucanus) and Cuvier's toucan (R. cuvieri).); Linnaeus, 1758 Three subspecies: R. t. tucanus; R. t. cuvieri; R. t. inca	Amazon rainforest	NE Unknown
Yellow-throated toucan	R. ambiguus Swainson, 1823 Three subspecies: R. a. swainsonii; R. a. ambiguus; R. a. abbreviatus	Central and northwestern South America	NT Unknown
