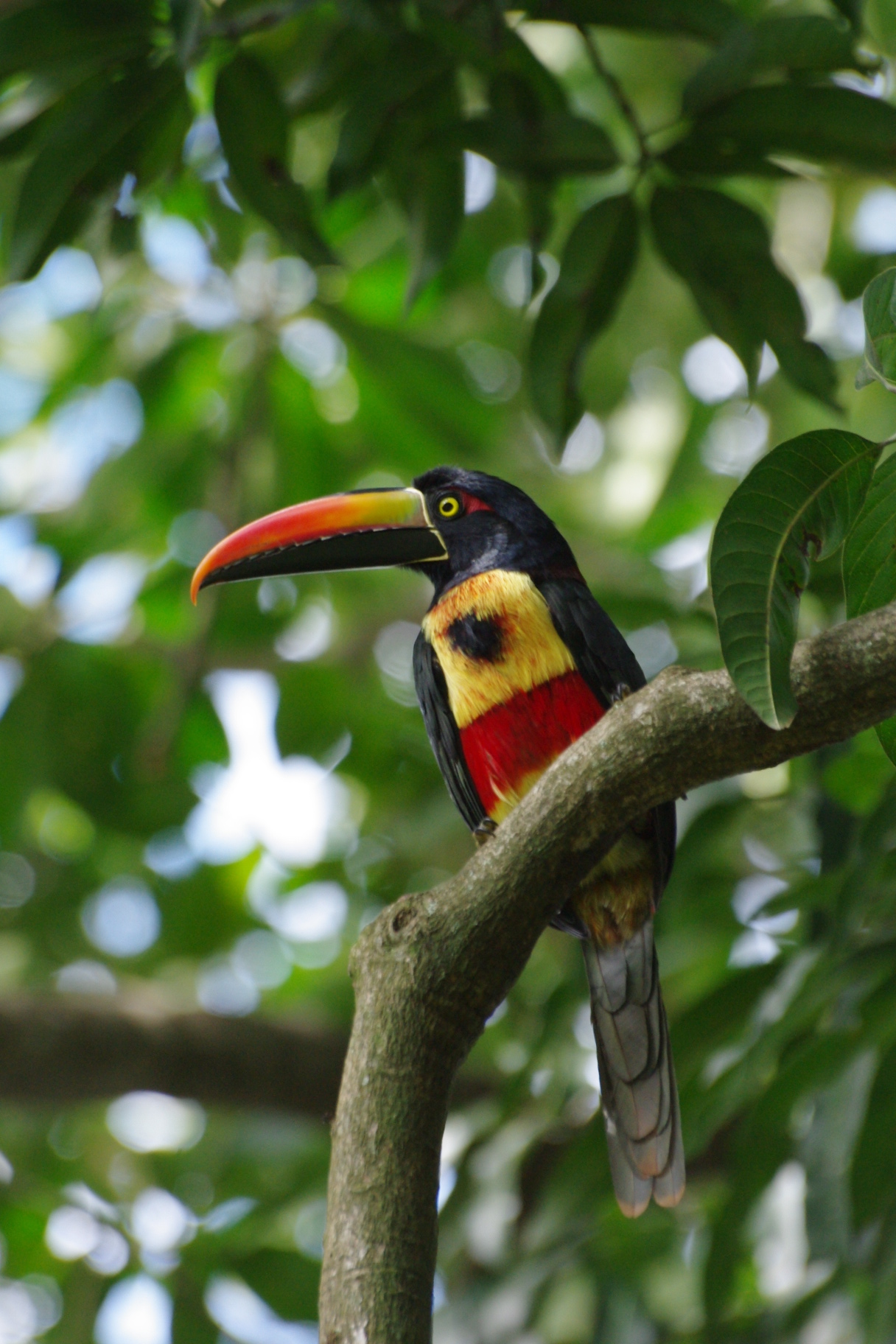
- In Alajuela, Costa Rica

Conservation status
- Least Concern (IUCN 3.1)

Scientific classification
- Kingdom: Animalia
- Phylum: Chordata
- Class: Aves
- Order: Piciformes
- Family: Ramphastidae
- Genus: Pteroglossus
- Species: P. frantzii

Binomial name
- Pteroglossus frantzii Cabanis, 1861

Synonyms
- Pteroglossus torquatus frantzii

= Fiery-billed aracari =

Species of bird

The fiery-billed aracari or fiery-billed araçari (Pteroglossus frantzii) is a bird in the toucan family Ramphastidae. It is found in Costa Rica and Panama.

== Taxonomy and systematics ==
Major taxonomic systems have long treated the fiery-billed aracari as a species that is closely related to the collared aracari (P. torquatus). At least one 20th century author treated it as a subspecies of the collared aracari.

The fiery-billed aracari is monotypic.

The species' specific epithet commemorates the German naturalist Alexander von Frantzius.

== Description ==
The fiery-billed aracari is about 45 cm (18 in) long and weighs 225 to 280 g (7.9 to 9.9 oz). Like other toucans, the fiery-billed aracari is brightly marked and has a large bill. The adult's bill has a vertical ivory line at its base. Its mandible is black. Its maxilla is mostly red, with a black culmen, yellow tip, and greenish base. Adults have a black head, neck, and throat with a chestnut collar on the nape. Bare red skin surrounds the eye. Their back is blue-green and their rump is red. Their underparts are bright yellow with a red band across the belly and a black spot in the center of the breast. Their thighs are chestnut. Females differ from males only in having a darker chestnut collar and a shorter bill. Immatures have duller plumage overall; its pattern and that of their bill are indistinct.

== Distribution and habitat ==
The fiery-billed aracari is found from the Gulf of Nicoya on Costa Rica's Pacific coast south into Panama's western Chiriquí Province. It formerly occurred as far east as Veraguas Province. It inhabits the interior and edges of wet primary and secondary forest. In elevation it mostly ranges from sea level to 1,200 m (3,940 ft) but is occasionally found as high as 1,800 m (5,910 ft).

== Behavior ==
=== Movement ===
The fiery-billed aracari is considered a year-round resident throughout its range.

=== Social behavior ===
Fiery-billed aracaris typically travel in groups of about six or more individuals that sometimes include other toucan species. They also roost communally; several may occupy a cavity overnight.

=== Feeding ===
The fiery-billed aracari's diet is mostly fruit but it also feeds on large insects, the eggs and nestlings of other birds, and other small vertebrates. It mostly forages in or close under the canopy but will feed on fruits in the understory. They glean fruit by stretching from a perch, bending, and even hanging upside down.

=== Breeding ===
The fiery-billed aracari's breeding season in Costa Rica is January to April and may extend later in Panama. The typical clutch size is two though sometimes more are laid. It typically nests in a woodpecker hole, either abandoned or from which they evict the woodpeckers, and which may be as high as 30 m (100 ft) above the ground. The incubation period and time to fledging are not known. Both parents incubate the eggs and provision the nestlings and fledglings. They are often helped by one or more other adults that may be from the previous season's brood. Young nestlings are fed mostly insects.

=== Vocalization ===
The fiery-billed aracari's calls include high pitched "'pseep' to 'sis-sik' in series" that are essentially the same as those of the collared aracari. It also makes "a croaking call, and soft rattle."

== Status ==
The IUCN has assessed the fiery-billed aracari as being of Least Concern. It has a large range and an estimated population of at least 50,000 mature individuals, though the latter is believed to be decreasing. No immediate threats have been identified. It occurs in at least two protected areas in Costa Rica. Its range contraction in Panama suggests that more research is needed.
