= Louis Antoine François Baillon =

Louis Antoine François Baillon (20 January 1778 – 2 December 1855) was a French naturalist and collector. He was born in Montreuil-sur-Mer and died in Abbeville. Baillon's crake is named for him, as is Baillon's shearwater and Baillonius bailloni.

Baillon's father, Jean-François-Emmanuel Baillon (25 July 1742 – 25 October 1801), a lawyer, natural history specimen collector, and correspondent of the Muséum national d'histoire naturelle, introduced him to natural history. In 1798, Baillon began work at as an assistant at the Jardin des Plantes, a position he relinquished following the death of his father. Afterwards, he settled in Abbeville, and like his father, became known for his correspondence with famed naturalists. In his studies, the younger Baillon maintained correspondence with Franco Andrea Bonelli, Étienne Geoffroy Saint-Hilaire and Prince Maximilian of Wied-Neuwied.

During his career, he continued and developed an ornithological collection that was initiated by his father, a collection that eventually grew to 6,000 items. Baillon's collection (birds only) is now conserved in "Musée George Sand et de la Vallée noire" in La Châtre. In addition to birds from France, it contains exotic specimens from French voyages of exploration, notably birds from the expeditions of Jacques Labillardière and Jules Dumont d'Urville.

The single publication of L.A.F. Baillon is the Catalogue des Mammifères, Oiseaux, Reptiles, Poissons et Mollusques testacés marins, observés dans l'arrondissement d'Abbeville.
