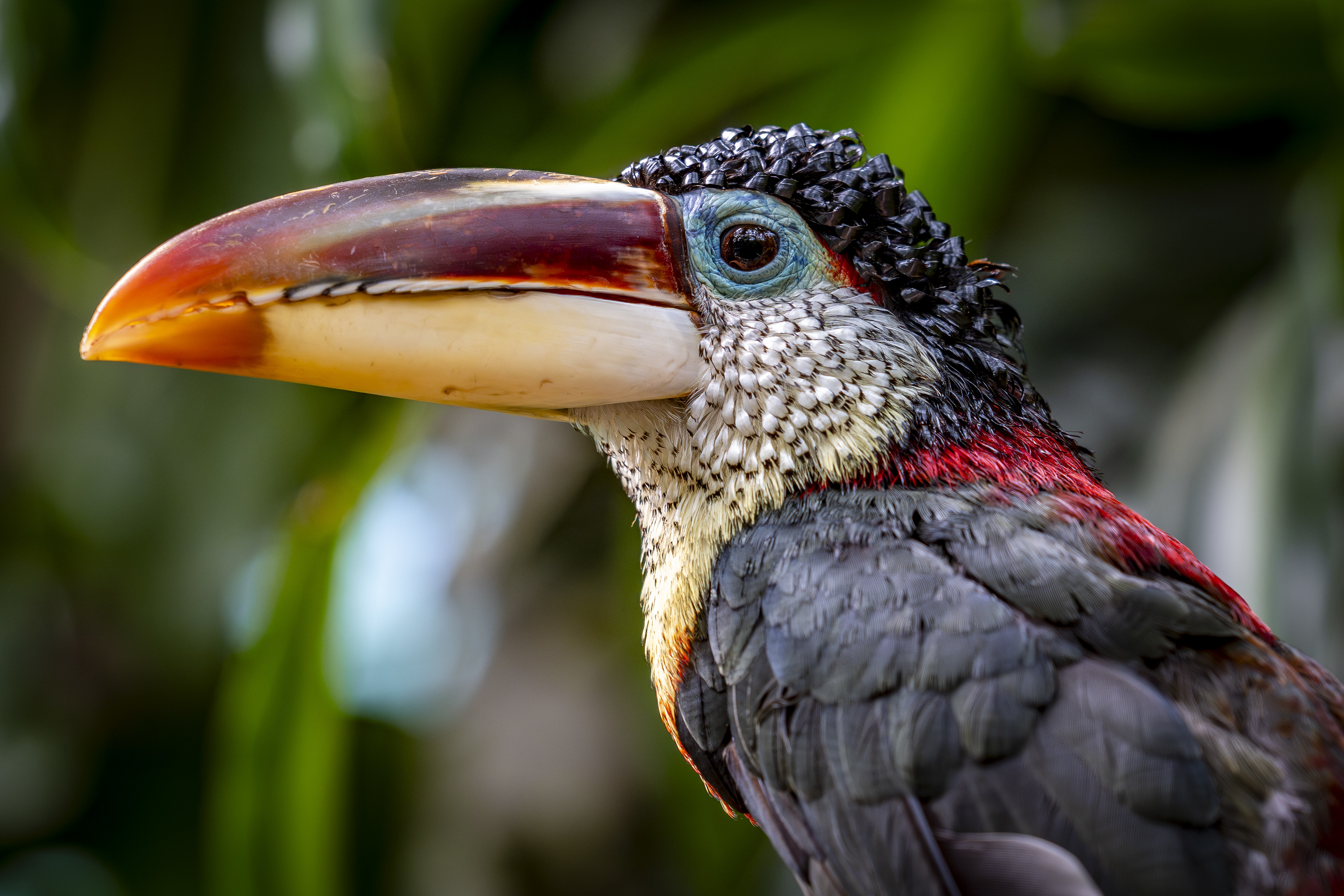
- At Woodland Park Zoo, US

Conservation status
- Least Concern (IUCN 3.1)

Scientific classification
- Kingdom: Animalia
- Phylum: Chordata
- Class: Aves
- Order: Piciformes
- Family: Ramphastidae
- Genus: Pteroglossus
- Species: P. beauharnaisii

Binomial name
- Pteroglossus beauharnaisii Wagler, 1831

Synonyms
- Beauharnaisius beauharnaesii; Pteroglossus Beauharnaesii Wagler, 1832; Pteroglossus Poeppigii Wagler, 1832; Pteroglossus ulocomus Gould, 1833; Pteroglossus lepidocephalus Nitzsch, 1840; Beauharnaisius ulocomus Bonaparte, 1850; Ulocomus beauharnaisi Heine, 1890; Pteroglossus (Beauharnaisius) beauharnaesii Peters, 1948

= Curl-crested aracari =

Species of bird

The curl-crested aracari or curl-crested araçari (Pteroglossus beauharnaisii) is a bird in the toucan family Ramphastidae. It is found in Bolivia, Brazil, and Peru.

== Taxonomy ==
The curl-crested aracari was first described by Johann Georg Wagler in 1831 but the spelling of its specific epithet was not corrected until 2020. It had at times been placed in the monotypic genera Beauharnaisius and Ulocomus.

The curl-crested aracari is monotypic.

== Description ==
The curl-crested aracari is 42 to 46 cm (17 to 18 in) long and weighs 164 to 280 g (5.8 to 9.9 oz). It gains its English name from unique curly, shiny, black feathers on the top of its head and nape; they resemble pieces of plastic or enamel. Males and females are alike except that the female has a shorter bill. Their bill has a brown-orange line at its base. The mandible is ivory becoming orangey at its tip. The maxilla has an orangey culmen and a maroon stripe along its lower part that is wider at the base. Between them the maxilla is green or bluish. It has indistinct ivory colored "teeth" along the tomium. Bare blue skin surrounds their eye, and their cheeks and throat are whitish with black speckles. Their upper back and rump are red and the rest of their upperparts are dark green. Their underparts are yellow with a wide red band across the lower breast. Their undertail coverts can have a red wash. Immatures are a duller version of adults.

== Distribution and habitat ==
The curl-crested aracari is found in the southwestern Amazon Basin south of the Amazon River. Its range extends from northern Peru south of the Marañón River east into western Brazil to the Madeira River and southeast to the Xingu River. From Peru the range also extends south into northern and central Bolivia and into Brazil as far as northern Mato Grosso. It inhabits the interior, clearings, and edges of wet forest both well-drained and swampy. It mostly occurs at elevations below 500 m (1,600 ft) but is found as high as 900 m (3,000 ft) near the Andes.

== Behavior ==
=== Movement ===
The curl-crested aracari apparently makes short-distance or local movements but is otherwise a year-round resident.

=== Feeding ===
The curl-crested aracari usually forages in groups of up to 12 individuals, and usually in the canopy. It does feed at fruiting bushes near the ground. Its diet has not been detailed but is known to be mostly fruit. Its diet also includes eggs and young of other birds, and it is known to tear apart the nests of yellow-rumped caciques (Cacicus cela) to obtain them.

=== Breeding ===
The curl-crested aracari's breeding season appears to be mostly May to August but it may start earlier and extend longer. Its nest, eggs, and the rest of its breeding biology are not known.

=== Vocalization ===
The curl-crested aracari's calls include series of "deep 'rrek' notes, soft 'rrr' to hard, even grunting 'grenk' notes". It also makes a "softer 'et-et'" when settling into a roost. Another author adds a "low, raucous 'cha-cha-cha cha wruh cha--'."

== Status ==
The IUCN has assessed the curl-crested aracari as being of Least Concern. It has a large range, but its population size is not known and is believed to be decreasing. No immediate threats have been identified. It occurs in Tambopata National Reserve in Peru. It is hunted, and "[m]ore data on this species' biology are essential, in case it becomes necessary to protect it".

== Gallery ==
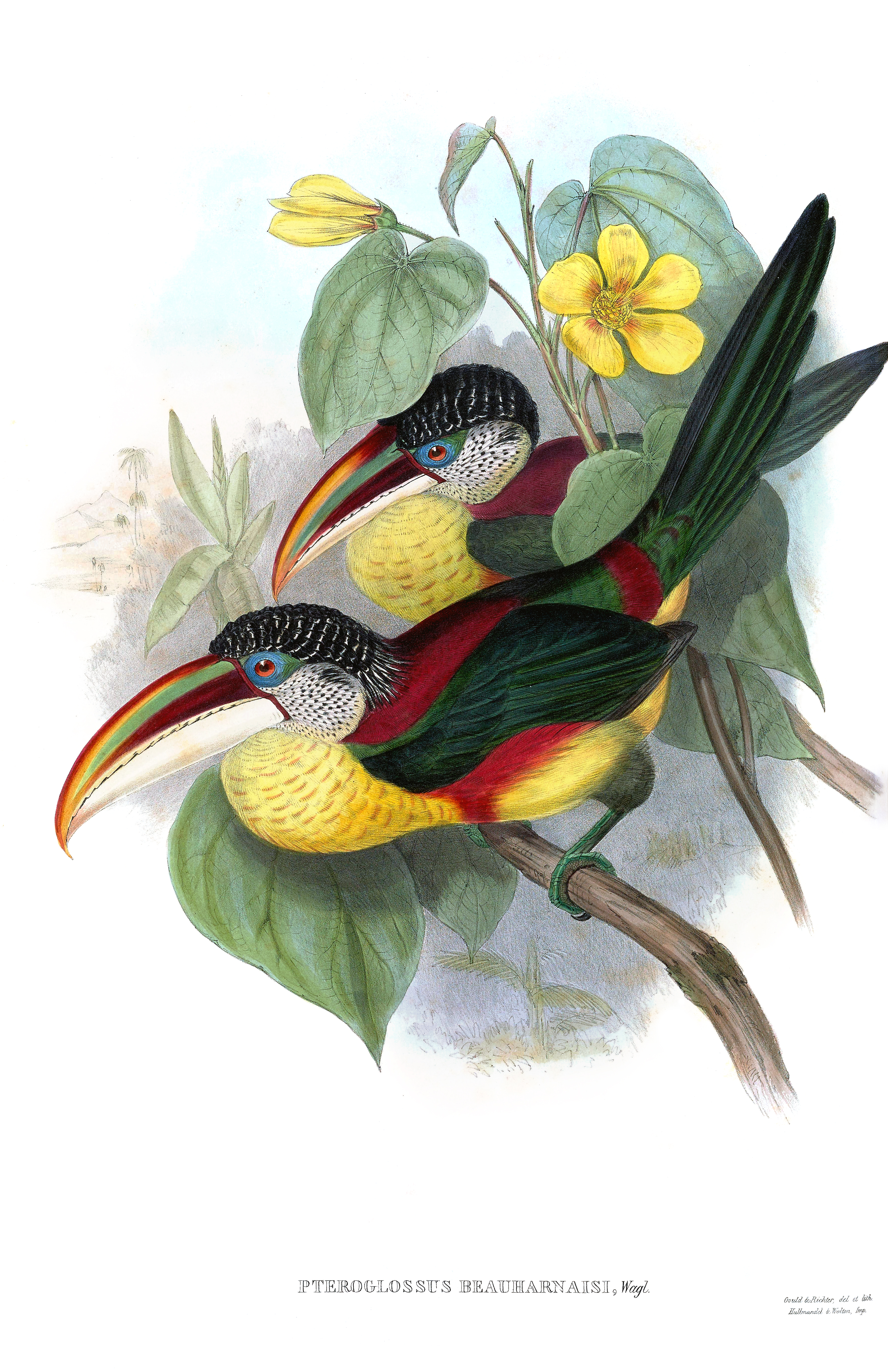
Illustration by John Gould and Henry Constantine Richter

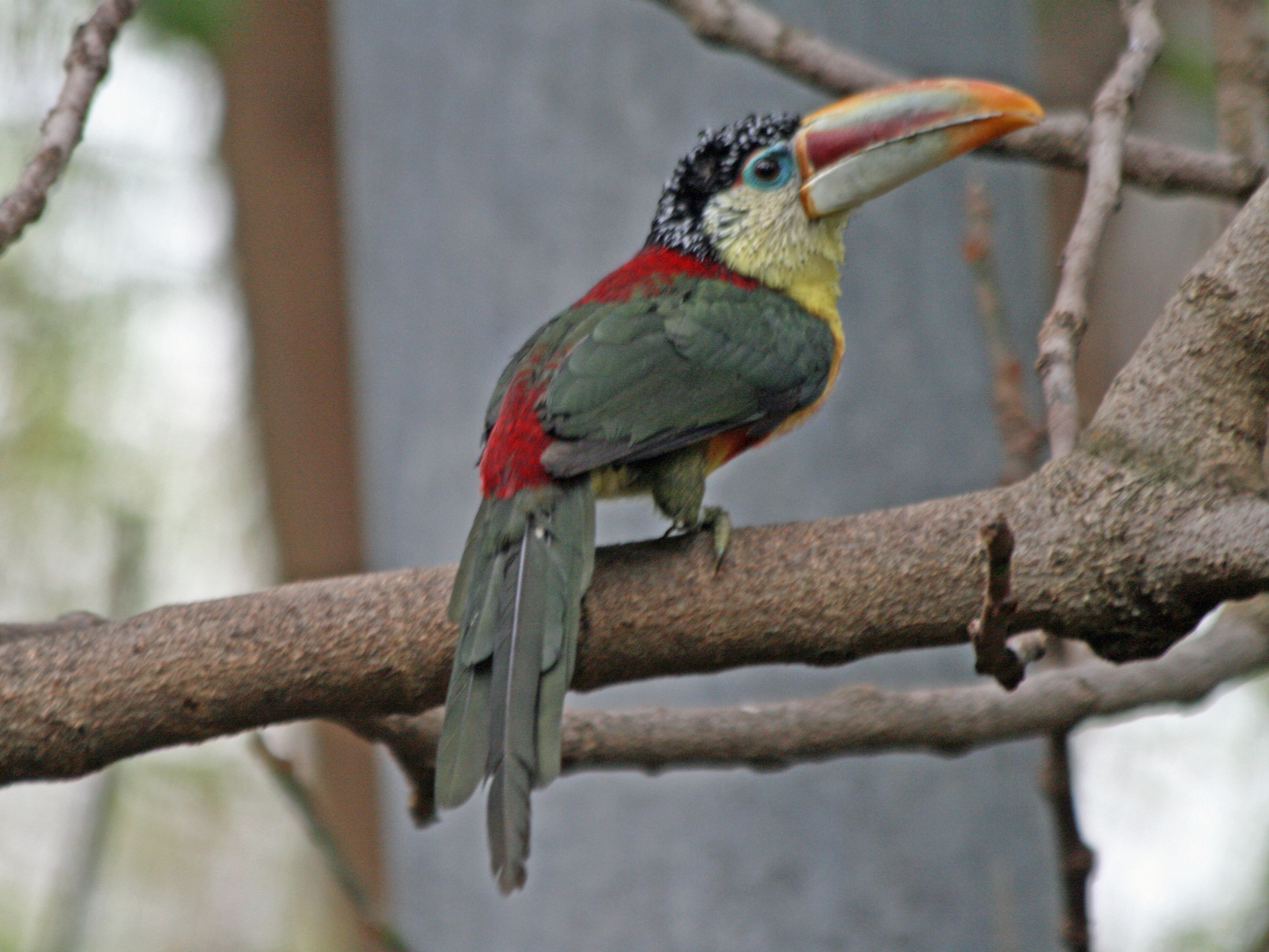
At San Diego Zoo, US

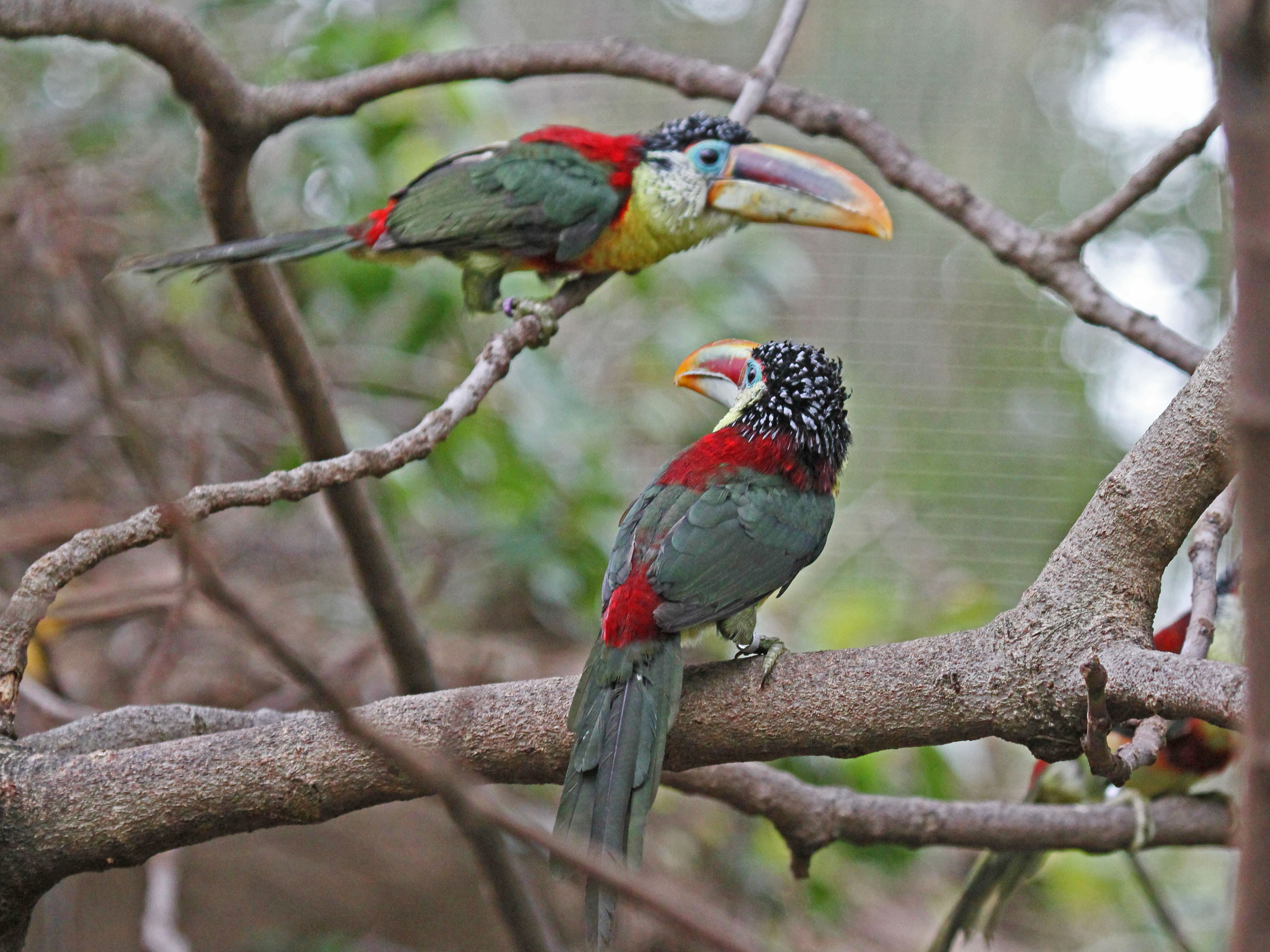
At San Diego Zoo
