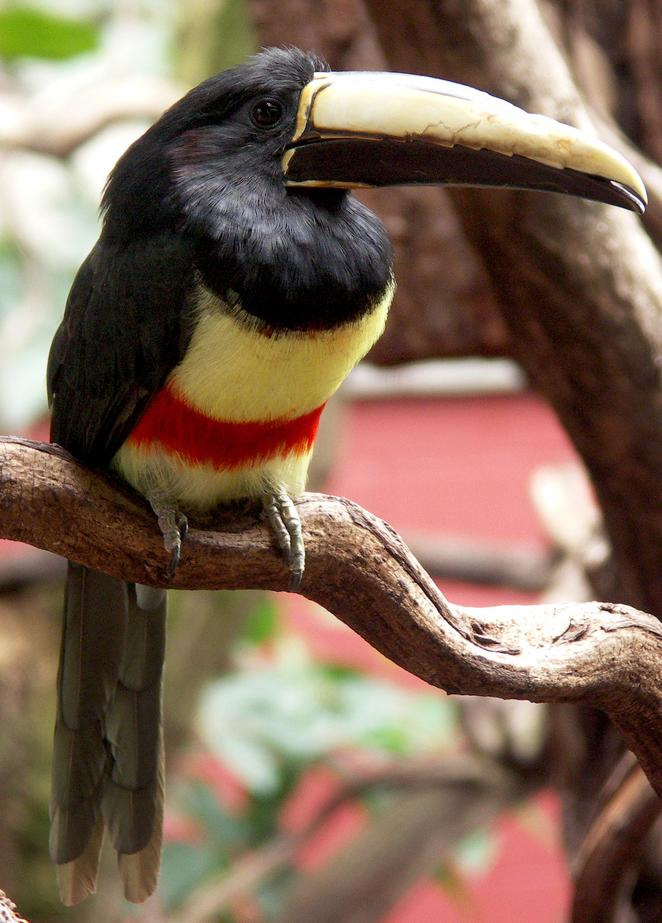

Conservation status
- Least Concern (IUCN 3.1)
- CITES Appendix II

Scientific classification
- Kingdom: Animalia
- Phylum: Chordata
- Class: Aves
- Order: Piciformes
- Family: Ramphastidae
- Genus: Pteroglossus
- Species: P. aracari

Binomial name
- Pteroglossus aracari (Linnaeus, 1758)

Synonyms
- Pteroglossus formosus Cabanis, 1862; Ramphastos aracari Linnaeus, 1758

= Black-necked aracari =

Species of bird

The black-necked aracari or black-necked araçari (Pteroglossus aracari) is a bird in the toucan family Ramphastidae. It is found in Brazil, French Guiana, Guyana, Suriname, and Venezuela.

== Taxonomy and systematics ==
The black-necked aracari was formally described by the Swedish naturalist Carl Linnaeus in 1758 in the tenth edition of his Systema Naturae. He placed it with the toucans in the genus Ramphastos and coined the binomial name Ramphastos aracari. Linnaeus based his description on the "Aracari" that had been described and illustrated by the German naturalist Georg Marcgrave in 1648 and the "Toucan or Brazilian Pye" that had been described and illustrated by the English naturalist George Edwards in 1747. The black-necked aracari is now placed in genus Pteroglossus that was introduced in 1811 by the German zoologist Johann Karl Wilhelm Illiger. The genus name combines the Ancient Greek pteron meaning "feather" with glōssa meaning "tongue". The specific epithet aracari comes from Arassari, the name of the species in the Tupi language. Alternative common names include Wied's aracari and Maximilian's aracari.

=== Subspecies ===
Three subspecies of black-necked aracari are recognized:

- P. a. atricollis (Statius Müller, PL, 1776)
- The nominate P. a. aracari (Linnaeus, 1758)
- P. a. wiedii Sturm, JHCF & Sturm, JW, 1847

All three subspecies have at times been treated as individual species. Further subspecies divisions have been proposed but not accepted.

== Description ==
The black-necked aracari is 43 to 46 cm (17 to 18 in) long and weighs 177 to 325 g (6.2 to 11 oz). Males and females have the same plumage and bill coloration, though the female's bill is shorter. Adults of the nominate subspecies have a black head, neck, and throat with chestnut-black ear coverts. Their brown eye is surrounded by blue-gray to black bare skin. Their upperparts are mostly green with a red rump. Their underparts are yellow with a wide red band across the lower breast and greenish thighs. Their bill has an ivory maxilla with a black culmen and base and a black mandible; a vertical white line is at the bill's base. Immatures' black and green plumage is sootier than adults' and the red and yellow paler. Their bill is browner without the "teeth" and has no basal white line.

Subspecies P. a. atricollis has a wider brown culmen stripe on the bill than the nominate, red-brown ear coverts, and cinnamon-rusty thighs. P. a. wiedii's culmen stripe is slightly wider than the nominate's and it has chestnut ear coverts, chin, and upper throat instead of black.

== Distribution and habitat ==
The subspecies of black-necked aracari are found thus:

- P. a. atricollis, eastern Venezuela, the Guianas and northern Brazil north of the Amazon River and east of the Rio Negro
- P. a. aracari, three separate populations in Brazil: in the northeast south of the Amazon between the Rio Madeira and Rio Maranhão and south to the states of Mato Grosso and Goiás, in eastern Pernambuco and eastern Alagoas in the far east, and in the southeast the states of Minas Gerais and Espírito Santo
- P. a. wiedii, southeastern Brazil south of the nominate to eastern Paraná and Santa Catarina

The species inhabits a wide variety of semi-open landscapes including edges and clearings in wet and sand-ridge forests, secondary forest, woodlands, cerrado, gallery forest in savanna, and plantations of fruit trees like papaya. In elevation it mostly occurs from sea level to about 600 m (2,000 ft) but is found higher in Venezuela and the southeastern part of its range.

== Behavior ==
=== Movement ===
The black-necked aracari is believed to be a year-round resident throughout its range.

=== Feeding ===
The black-necked aracari forages in the forest's upper level and the canopy, often in a group of up to six that might be an extended family. It mostly feeds on fruit and is important as a disperser of fruit tree seeds. It also eats insects and has been observed taking a nestling bird.

=== Breeding ===
The black-necked aracari's breeding season is from November to August in most of its range but spans September to February in the south. It nests in hollows in trees created by either woodpeckers or by broken tree branches. The clutch size is two to four eggs. The incubation period is 16 to 17 days and fledging occurs about 23 days after hatch. Both parents incubate the eggs and care for the young.

=== Vocalization ===
A common black-necked aracari call is "'tsee-eet' to 'sneet'...sometimes longer as 'tseeeeeee-it'". It also makes a "rattled 'bdd-dddit'" that might be vocal or from rattling the bill.

== Status ==
The IUCN has assessed the black-necked aracari as being of Least Concern. It has a very large range but its population size is not known and is believed to be decreasing. No immediate threats have been identified. It is "relatively common in many areas" and occurs in several protected areas. However, it is hunted in places.
