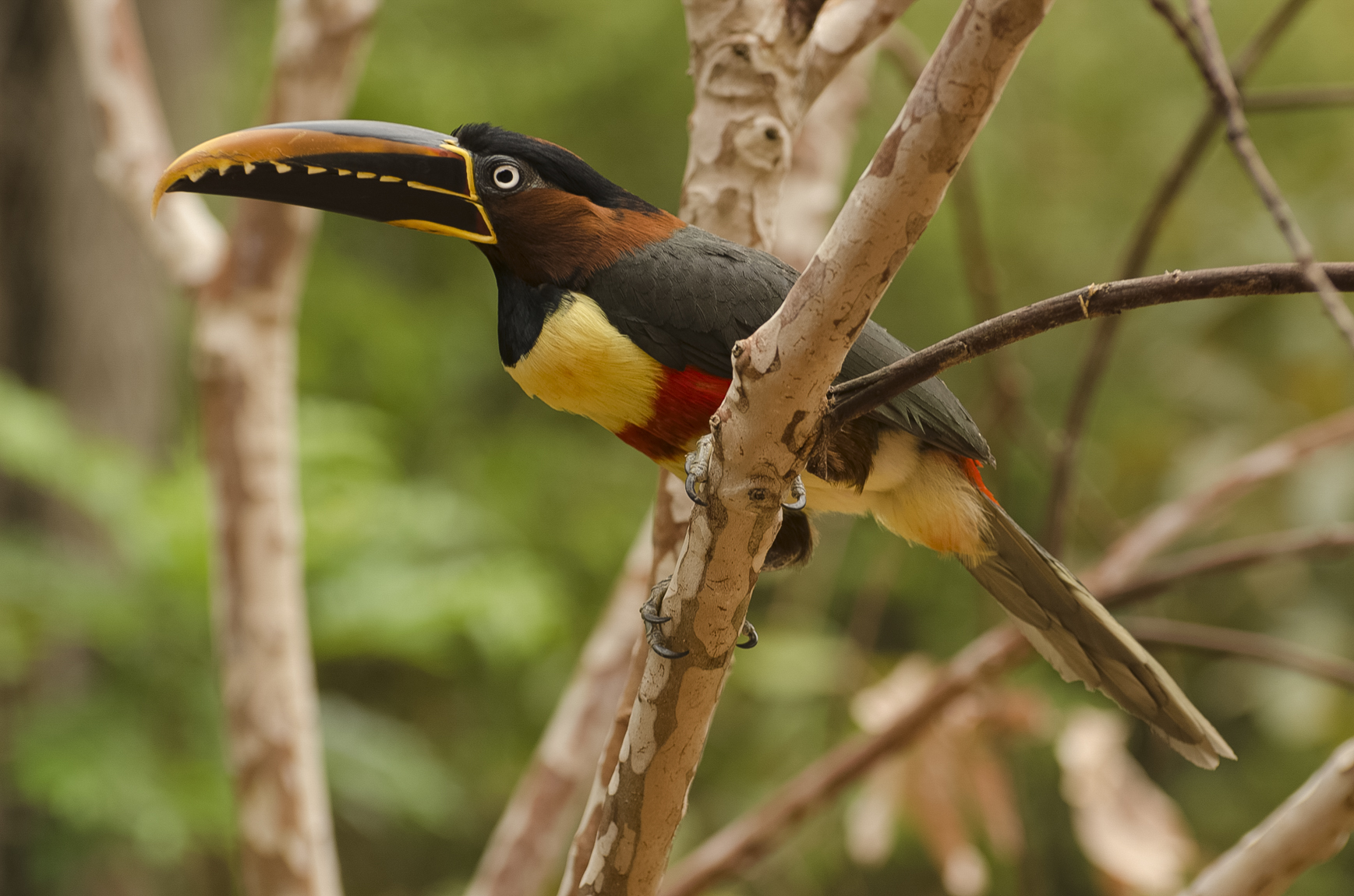

Conservation status
- Least Concern (IUCN 3.1)

Scientific classification
- Kingdom: Animalia
- Phylum: Chordata
- Class: Aves
- Order: Piciformes
- Family: Ramphastidae
- Genus: Pteroglossus
- Species: P. castanotis

Binomial name
- Pteroglossus castanotis Gould, 1834

Subspecies
- See text

= Chestnut-eared aracari =

Species of bird

The chestnut-eared aracari or chestnut-eared araçari (Pteroglossus castanotis) is a bird in the toucan family Ramphastidae. It is found in Argentina, Bolivia, Brazil, Colombia, Ecuador, Paraguay, and Peru.

== Taxonomy and systematics ==
Two subspecies of chestnut-eared aracari are recognized: the nominate P. c. castanotis (Gould, 1834) and P. c. australis (Cassin, 1867).

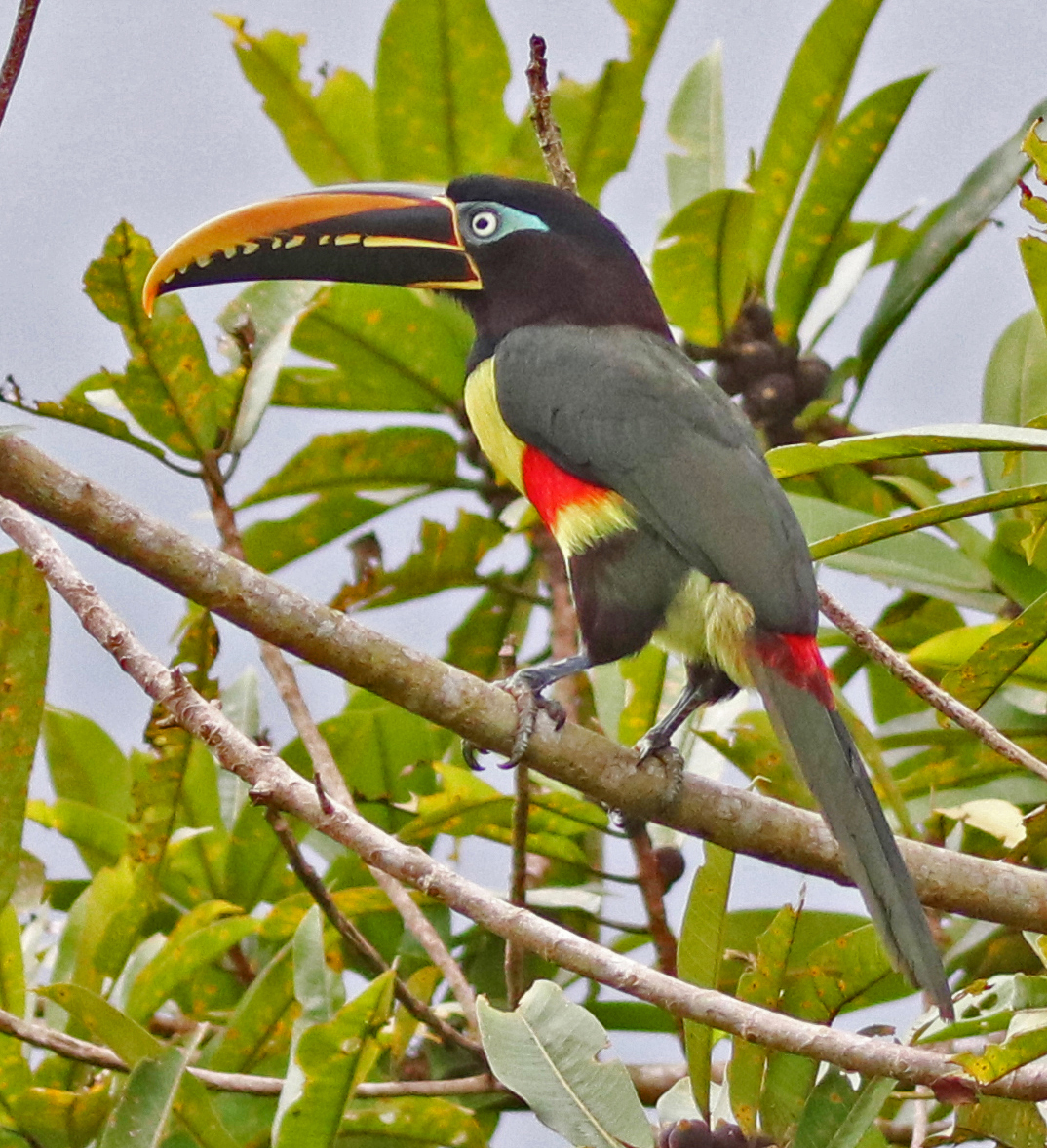
Castanotis subspecies in eastern Ecuador

== Description ==
The chestnut-eared aracari is 43 to 47 cm (17 to 19 in) long and weighs 220 to 310 g (7.8 to 11 oz). Males and females have the same bill coloration, though the female's bill is shorter. The bills of nominate subspecies adults have a yellow line at the base and a mostly black mandible. The maxilla has a black stripe on the culmen, a triangle of black narrowing toward the tip, orange-yellow between them, and black and ivory markings on the edge that look like teeth. Adult males have a black crown and upper nape, a chestnut lower nape, a dark green back, and a red rump. They have blue facial skin, and the sides of their face and their upper throat are brown to chestnut. Their lower throat is black, their breast yellow, their lower breast red and chestnut-black, their belly yellow, and their thighs usually cinnamon. Adult females are browner than males on the crown, nape, and upper throat, and the black band on the lower throat is thinner. Juveniles are duller overall, with a muted bill pattern without the "teeth" and no yellow basal line.

Subspecies P. c. australis is paler overall than the nominate. Their cheeks and upper throat are rusty, their breast band red and rufous, and their thighs green and rusty. Their bill has a wider orange basal line than the nominate and has a red mark next to it.

== Distribution and habitat ==
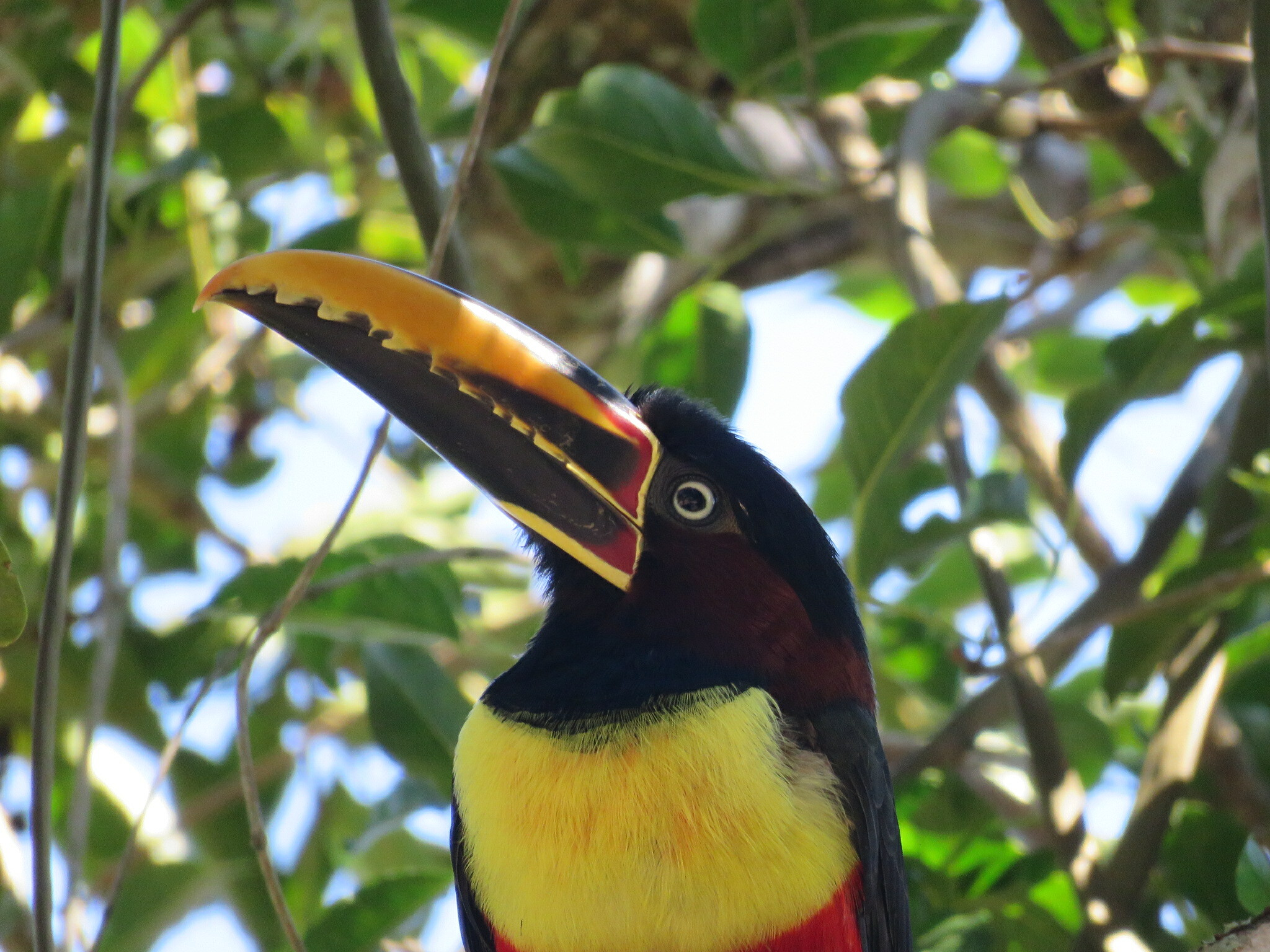
Photo of chestnut-eared aracari at Iguaçu National Park

The chestnut-eared aracari is a bird of the western and southern Amazon Basin. The nominate subspecies is the more northerly. It is found from southern and eastern Colombia south through eastern Ecuador to southeastern Peru, east into Brazil along the Amazon to the Rio Negro and Acre and Amazonas states. P. c. australis is found from south of the Amazon in north-central Brazil south through northern Bolivia, eastern Paraguay, and northeastern Argentina's Misiones Province into southeastern Brazil to Minas Gerais, São Paulo state, and Rio Grande do Sul.

The chestnut-eared aracari is found in a wide variety of landscapes, many of which are characterized by standing or flowing water. Examples include wet forest by lakes and rivers, várzea, forested river islands, and swamp and gallery forest. It also occurs at edges, clearings, and disturbed areas of drier forest, bamboo and cane brakes, cerrado, and coffee plantations. In elevation it is mostly found below 600 m (2,000 ft) but occurs up to about 1,300 m (4,300 ft) at some Andean locations and to more than 1,000 m (3,300 ft) in southeastern Brazil.

== Behavior ==
=== Movement ===
The chestnut-eared aracari does not make conventional migration but does gather in loose flocks and move for the austral winter into areas with much fruit, such as plantations.

=== Feeding ===
The chestnut-eared aracari's diet is mostly fruit. It forages at all levels of the forest, plucking fruit from branches (even while hanging upside down) and investigating and probing vines, shrubs, crevices, and cavities. It also eats flowers and nectar and takes bird eggs and nestlings.

=== Breeding ===
The chestnut-eared aracari's breeding season varies widely across its range, from February to September in the north and west to the opposite September to February in the southernmost population. It mostly nests in old woodpecker holes that it enlarges if needed. There is some evidence of cooperative breeding, as small groups at a nest are more common than just pairs. Its clutch size is at least two and may be as large as four. The incubation period and time to fledging are not known.

=== Vocalization ===
The chestnut-eared aracari's principal call is a "piercing and high-pitched... 'sneeep' to [a] longer 'psheee-eeep '"'. It also makes a "single 'tekk' call, low 'eeee-eee' call with 4 whistled 'weet' notes and a 'pyeee-tyee-tyee-tyee-tyet'."

== Status ==
The IUCN has assessed the chestnut-eared aracari as being of Least Concern. It has an extremely large range but an unknown population size that is believed to be decreasing. No immediate threats have been identified. It is thought common in Colombia and Peru, uncommon to fairly common in Ecuador, and "relatively common" in most of the rest of its range. It is found in many protected areas but is still hunted in some places. "Rather catholic in its use of habitats; probably more tolerant of changes, and more adaptable, than are its more forest-restricted relatives."
