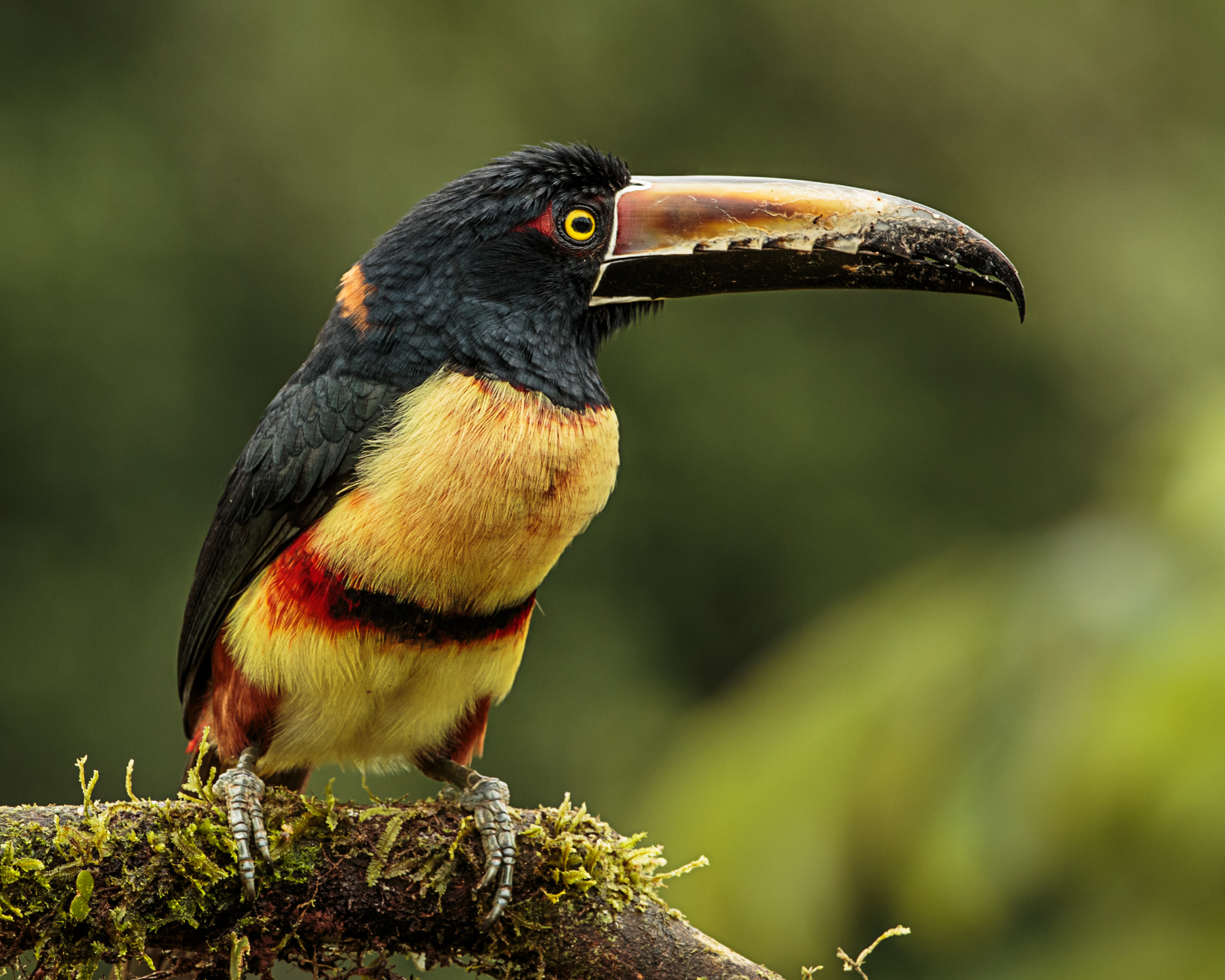
- P. t. torquatus, Costa Rica

Conservation status
- Least Concern (IUCN 3.1)

Scientific classification
- Kingdom: Animalia
- Phylum: Chordata
- Class: Aves
- Order: Piciformes
- Family: Ramphastidae
- Genus: Pteroglossus
- Species: P. torquatus

Binomial name
- Pteroglossus torquatus (Gmelin, JF, 1788)

Subspecies
- See text

Synonyms
- Ramphastos torquatus

= Collared aracari =

Species of bird

The collared aracari or collared araçari (Pteroglossus torquatus) is a bird in the toucan family Ramphastidae. It is found from Mexico to Colombia and Venezuela.

== Taxonomy ==
The collared aracari was described by the Spanish naturalist Francisco Hernández (1514–1587) in his work Rerum medicarum Novae Hispaniae thesaurus, seu, Plantarum animalium mineralium Mexicanorum historia which was published posthumously in 1651. In his Latin text Hernández used the name De Cochitenacatl, the word for the bird in the local Nahuatl language. Later ornithologists based their own descriptions on that by Hernández. These included Mathurin Brisson in 1760, the Comte de Buffon in 1780, and John Latham in 1782.

When the German naturalist Johann Friedrich Gmelin revised and expanded Carl Linnaeus's Systema Naturae in 1788 he included the collared aracari and cited the descriptions by earlier ornithologists. He placed it with the toucans in the genus Ramphastos and coined the binomial name Ramphastos torquatus. The specific epithet is a Latin word meaning "collared". When John Gould published a hand-coloured illustration of the collared aracari in 1854 he commented: "We find in the writings of the older authors—Gmelin, Latham, and others—a species of this family called Ramphastos torquatus, which may have been intended to indicate the present bird, but their descriptions and measurements are somewhat inapplicable; at the same time it is the only species yet discovered having a distinct reddish collar at the back of the neck, and there is no other bird which agrees so well with their obscure descriptions". The type location has been restricted to the state of Veracruz in southeast Mexico. The collared aracari is now one of 14 species placed in the genus Pteroglossus that was introduced in 1811 by Johann Karl Wilhelm Illiger.

The International Ornithological Committee (IOC) and BirdLife International's Handbook of the Birds of the World (HBW) recognize three subspecies:

- P. t. torquatus – (Gmelin, 1788)
- P. t. erythrozonus – Ridgway, 1912
- P. t. nuchalis – Cabanis, 1862 (originally described as a separate species.)

The South American Classification Committee of the American Ornithological Society and the Clements taxonomy include two other subspecies that IOC and HBW separate as the stripe-billed aracari (P. sanguineus) and pale-mandibled aracari (P. erythropygius).

This article follows the IOC/HBW three-subspecies model.

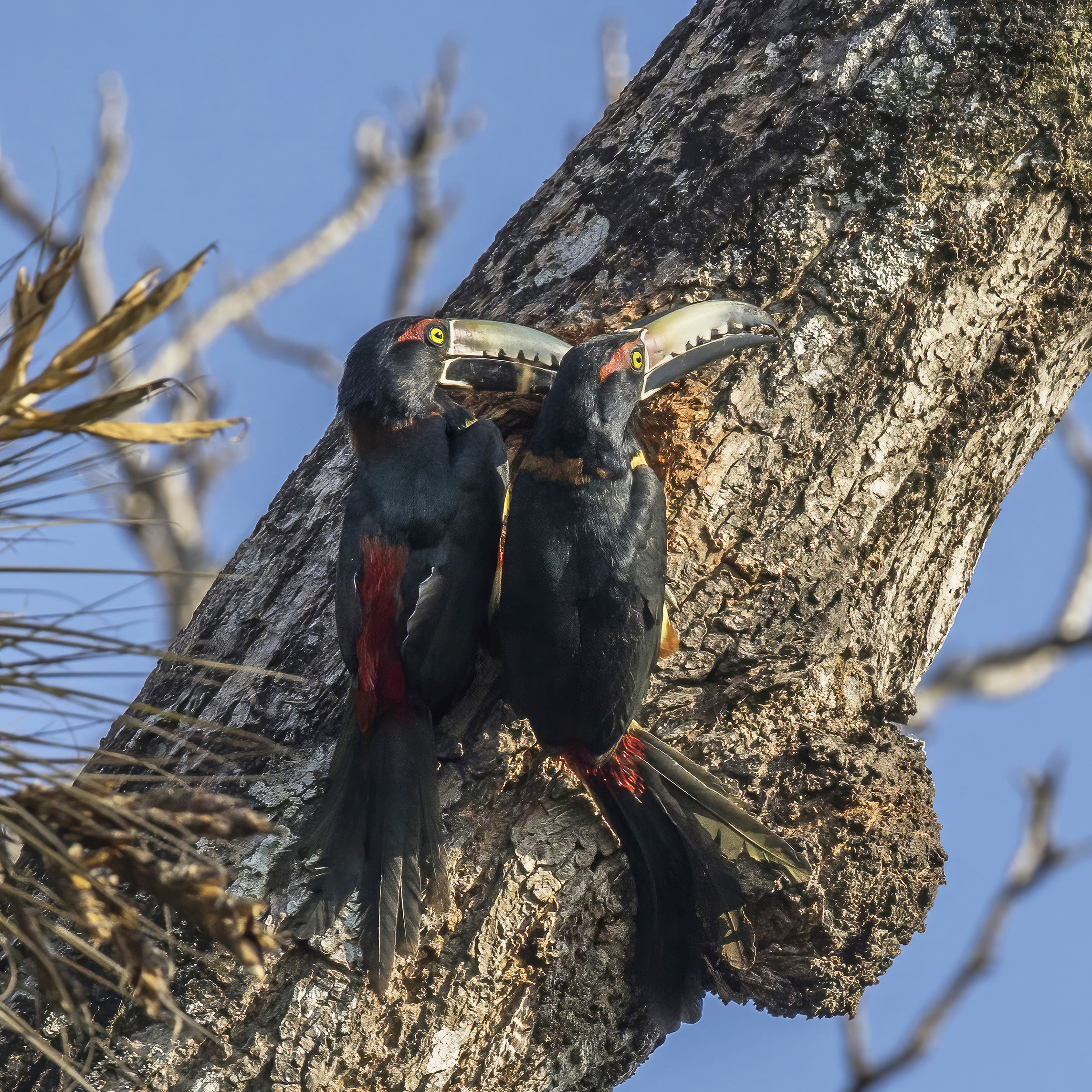
Pair at nest

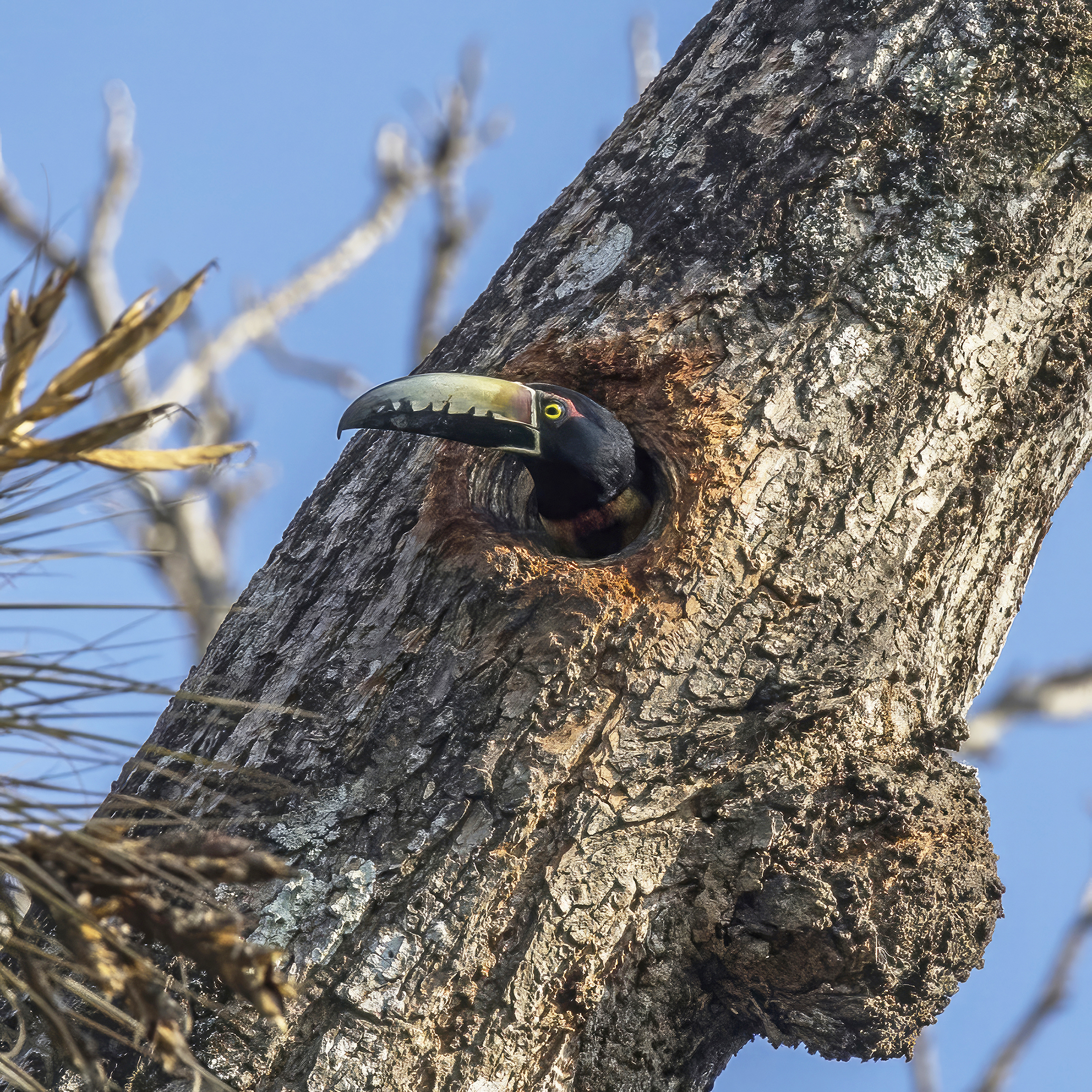
Looking out of the nest
P. t. torquatus, Guatemala

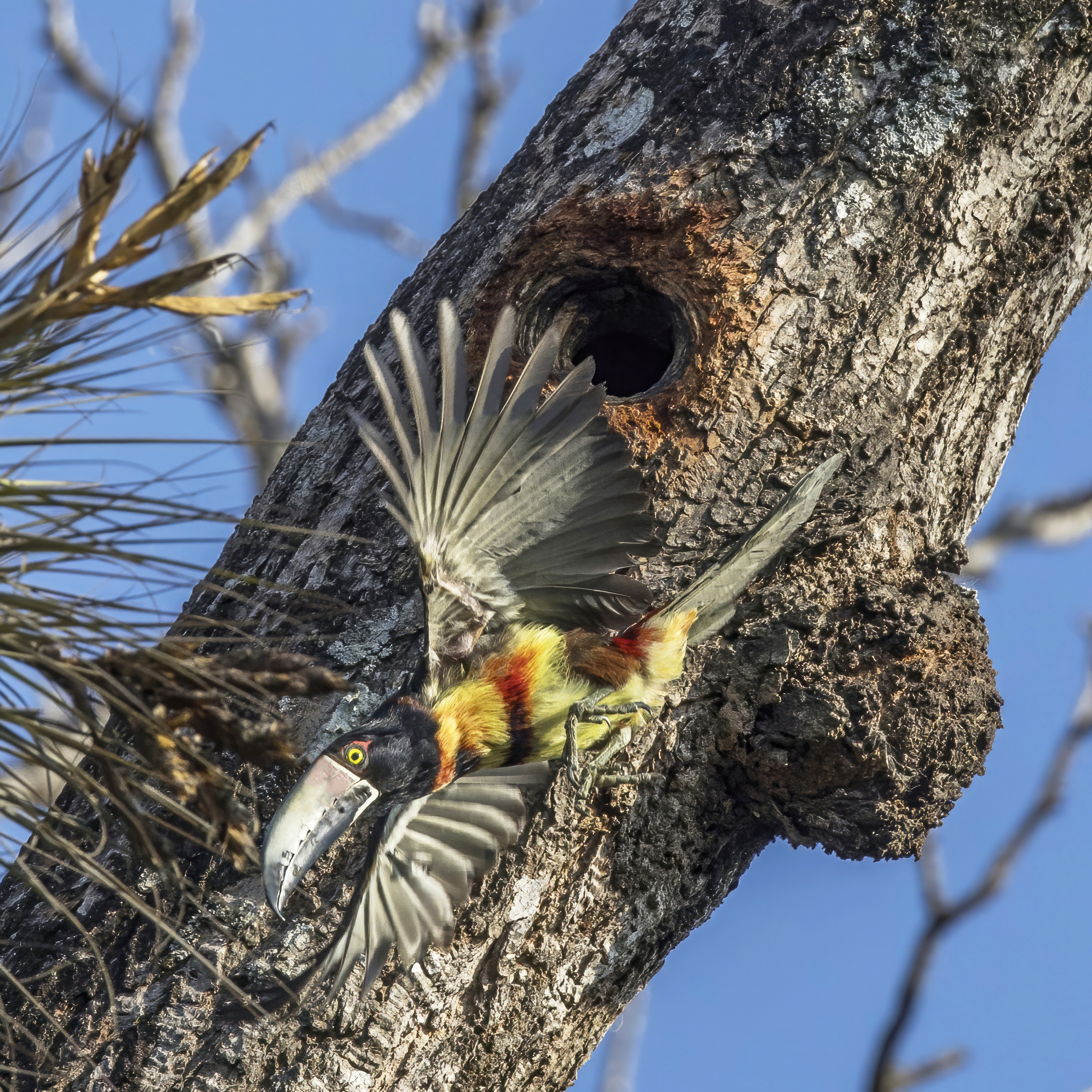
Leaving the nest

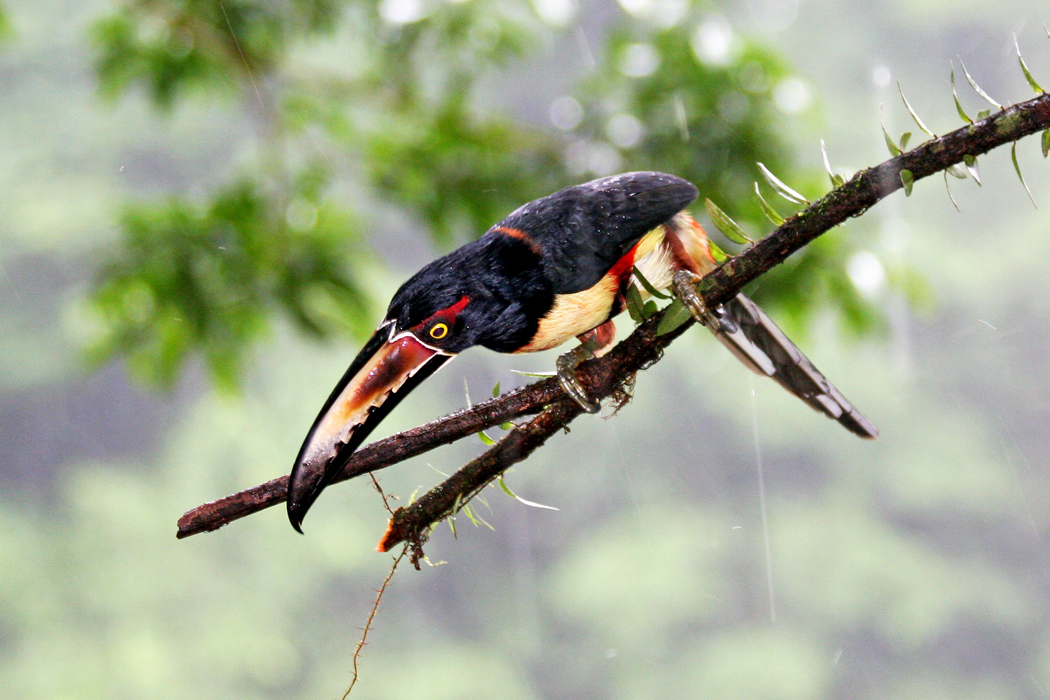
The red collar, which gives the bird its name, is visible on the back of the neck of this Costa Rican bird.

== Description ==
Like other toucans, the collared aracari is brightly marked and has a large bill. Adults are 38 to 41 cm (15 to 16 in) long and weigh 175 to 250 g (6.2 to 8.8 oz). Males and females have the same coloration of the bill and plumage but the female's bill is shorter than the male's. The three subspecies' bills are alike. The adult's bill has a narrow vertical white line at its base. Its maxilla is buffy white darkening to dull reddish brown at its base. Its tip and culmen are black. The maxilla has black and yellowish white notches. The bill's mandible is black. Adults of the nominate subspecies have mostly glossy black upperparts with a narrow cinnamon rufous collar at the base of the nape and bright red lower back, rump, and uppertail coverts. Their head, throat, and uppermost breast are greenish black. Their lower breast, belly, and undertail coverts are yellow. The breast has a variable red wash and a black spot in its center; the upper belly is crossed by a narrow red and black band. Their thighs are cinnamon to rufous. Juvenile collared aracaris are much duller than adults, with a sooty-black head and chest and brownish olive upperparts. The red rump and yellow underparts are paler, and the breast spot, belly band, and bill pattern are indistinct.

Subspecies P. t. erythrozonus is similar to the nominate but smaller and has a much smaller breast spot or none at all. P. t. nuchalis is also similar to the nominate, but its breast spot is usually larger and the white basal line on the bill is wider.

The most common call is described as "a high, sharp, squeaky, note, such as seek, pseek, pink or penk, or a two-parted pi-cheet or squi-zeek." They also make a "purr" and an "aggressive, rasping grhhrr". A rattle call "bddddddt" may actually be non-vocal. Collared aracari's wings make an audible whir during flight.

== Distribution and habitat ==
The subspecies of collared aracari are found thus:

- P. t. torquatus, from east-central Mexico south through Central America to just into northwestern Colombia, but not on the Yucatán Peninsula
- P. t. erythrozonus, southeastern Mexico including the Yucatán Peninsula, Belize, and Peten in northern Guatemala
- P. t. nuchalis, northern Colombia and northern Venezuela

The collared aracari inhabits the interior and edges of evergreen primary forest and mature secondary forest and also coffee, cacao, and fruit plantations. In the semi-arid parts of northern Colombia and Venezuela it also occurs in gallery forest. In elevation it is found from sea level to about 1,000 m (3,300 ft).

== Behavior ==
=== Social behavior ===
Collared aracaris typically travel in groups of about six to fifteen individuals that sometimes include other toucan species. They also roost communally; up to seven may occupy a cavity overnight.

=== Feeding ===
The collared aracari's diet is mostly fruit but it also feeds on large insects, the eggs and nestlings of other birds, and other small vertebrates. It mostly forages from the forest's mid level to the canopy but will feed on fruits in the understory. They glean fruit by stretching from a perch, bending, and even hanging upside down. They regurgitate large fruit seeds which often remain viable.

=== Breeding ===
The collared aracari's breeding season is from January to May in most of its range. It nests in tree cavities, usually those excavated by large woodpeckers but also natural ones. They may enlarge the cavity, which can be up to 30 m (98 ft) above the ground. The clutch size is usually three eggs but can be as large as five. The incubation period is 16 to 17 days and both parents incubate. Fledging occurs 26 to 30 days after hatch. The parents and often up to three other adults provision the nestlings. They are fed mostly with insects when young.

== Status ==
The IUCN has assessed the collared aracari as being of Least Concern. It has an extremely large range but an unknown population size that is believed to be decreasing. No immediate threats have been identified. "[A]lthough it tolerates secondary forest, it nonetheless is very susceptible to deforestation" and is hunted by indigenous peoples.
