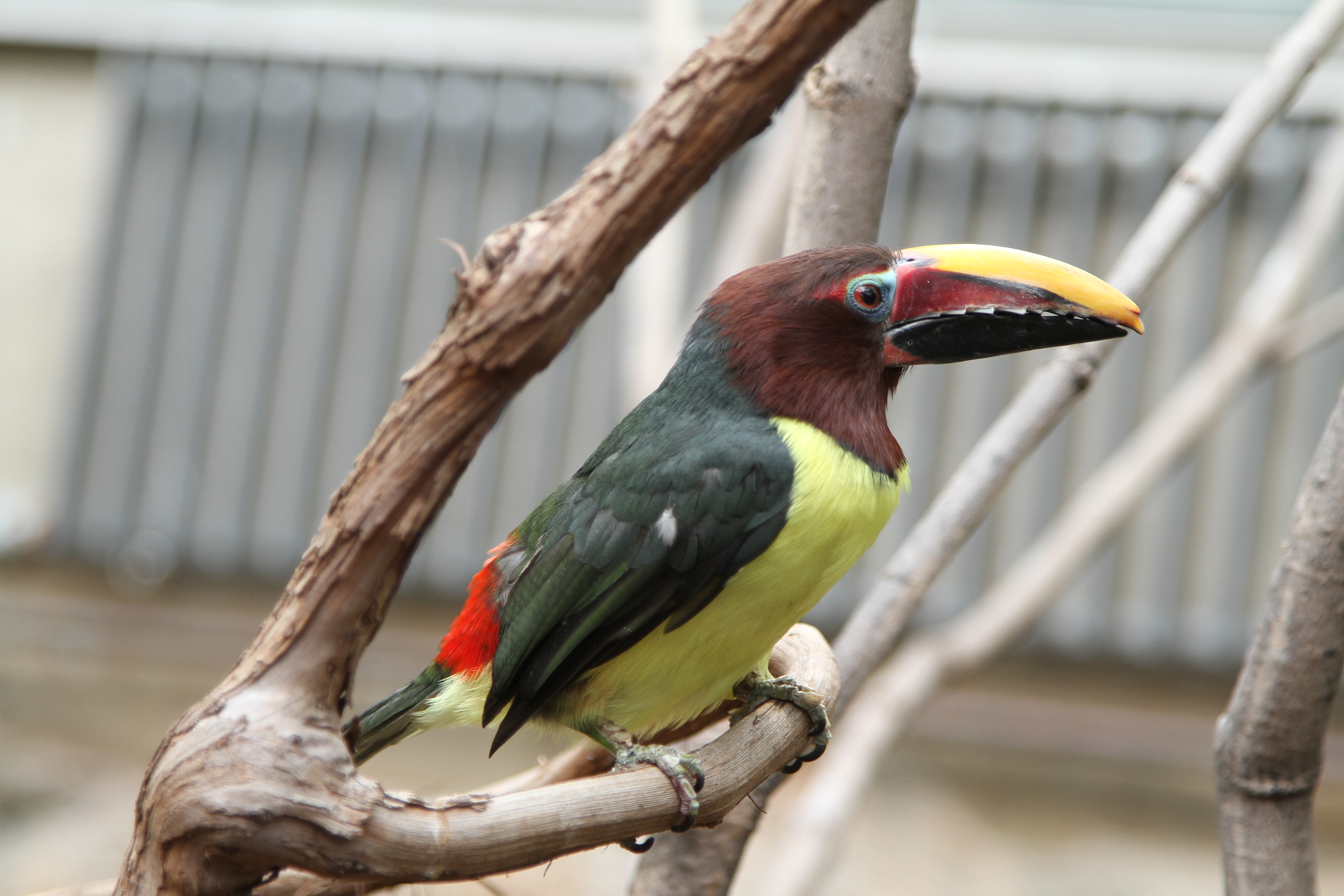
- Female at Philadelphia Zoo, Pennsylvania, US

Conservation status
- Least Concern (IUCN 3.1)
- CITES Appendix II

Scientific classification
- Kingdom: Animalia
- Phylum: Chordata
- Class: Aves
- Order: Piciformes
- Family: Ramphastidae
- Genus: Pteroglossus
- Species: P. viridis

Binomial name
- Pteroglossus viridis (Linnaeus, 1766)

Synonyms
- Ramphastos viridis Linnaeus, 1766

= Green aracari =

Species of bird

The green araçari (Pteroglossus viridis), is a toucan, a bird in the family Ramphastidae. It is found in the lowland forests of northeastern South America (the Guiana Shield), in the northeast Amazon Basin, the Guianas and the eastern Orinoco River drainage of Venezuela. At 30–40 cm. (12–16 in) long and weighing 110–160 grams (3.9–5.7 oz.), it is the smallest aracari in its range, and among the smallest members of the toucan family.

== Taxonomy and systematics ==
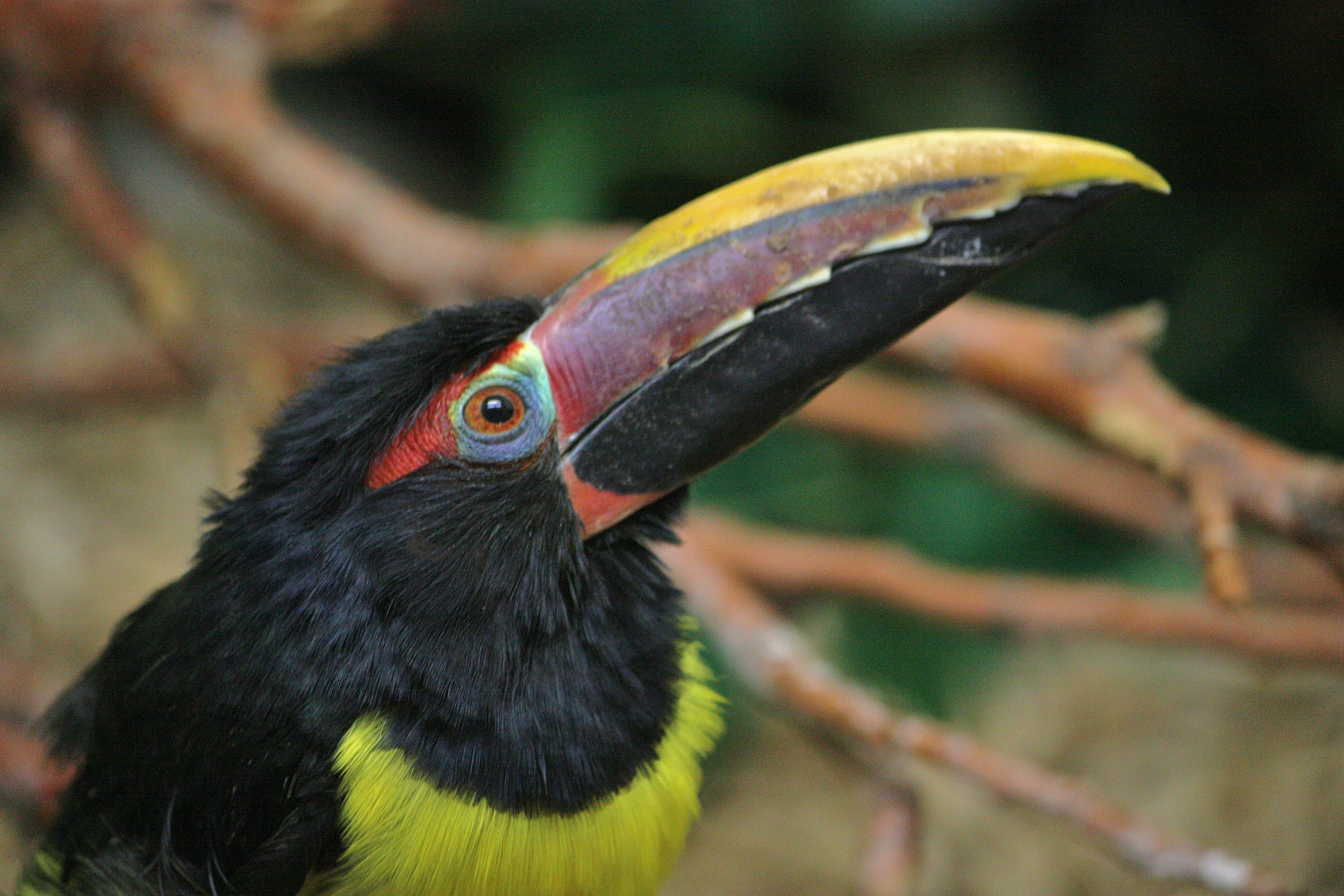
Males differ from females in having a black hood, but have the same characteristic bill pattern. Denver Zoo, Denver, Colorado.

The green aracari was originally classified in the genus Ramphastos. The species is named for the green feathers covering its back.

== Description ==
Males' crowns are black, while females' are reddish brown.

== Behaviour and ecology ==
=== Breeding ===
Breeding occurs from February to June. It nests in tree cavities, producing 2–4 white eggs. The parents cooperate in rearing their young.

=== Food and feeding ===
Its diet consists mostly of fruit, including the fruits of Cecropia trees and the palm Oenocarpus bacaba. The serrated edges of the green aracari's large bill help the bird to grip and gather fruit. Insects are also an occasional part of the diet, giving the birds additional protein.

== Pets ==
In captivity it is the most frequently bred member of the toucan family and is the most popular as a tame hand-fed pet. It requires a large cage and toys to prevent boredom due to its active nature, and a high-fruit diet.
