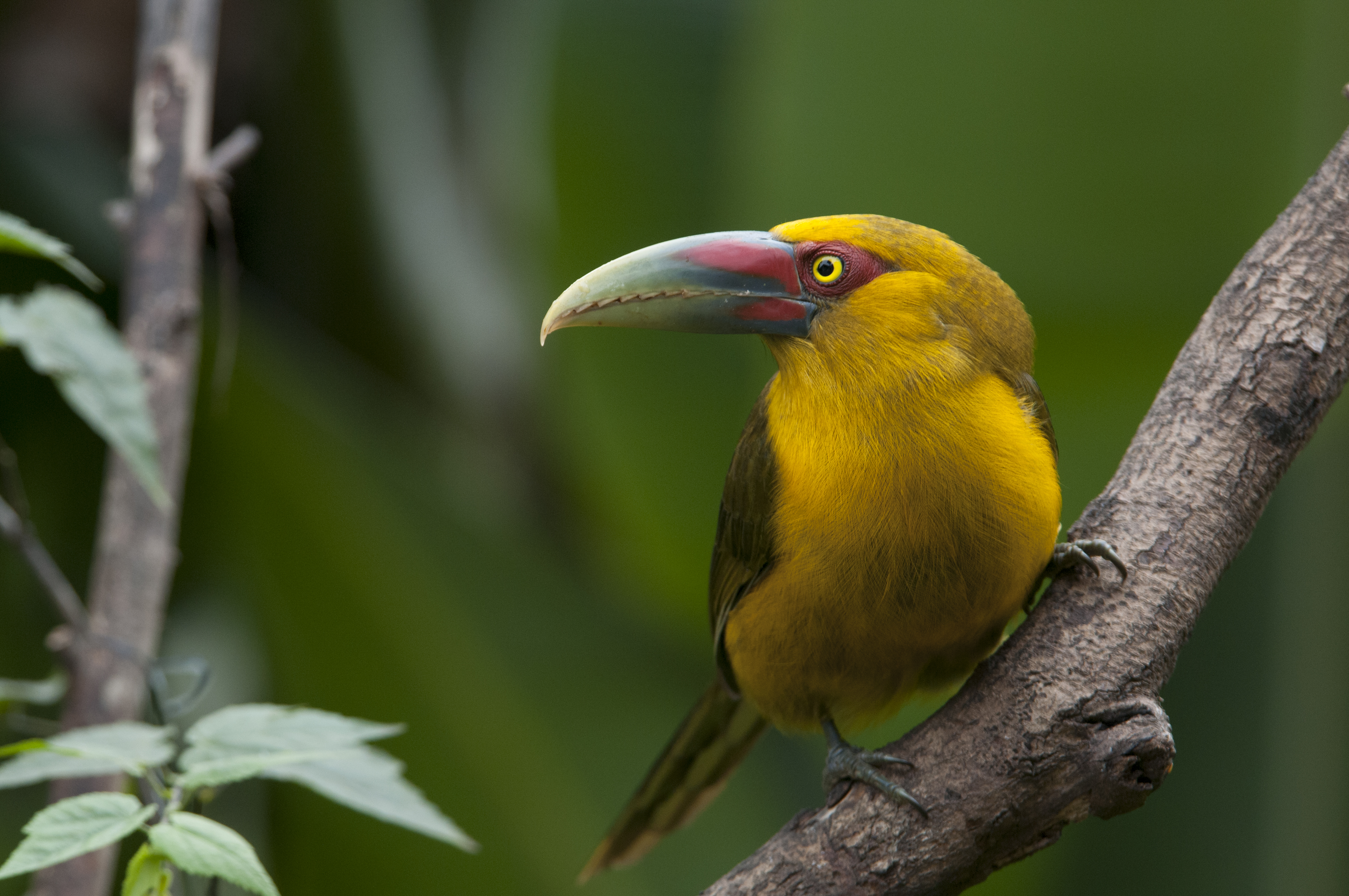

Conservation status
- Near Threatened (IUCN 3.1)

Scientific classification
- Kingdom: Animalia
- Phylum: Chordata
- Class: Aves
- Order: Piciformes
- Family: Ramphastidae
- Genus: Pteroglossus
- Species: P. bailloni

Binomial name
- Pteroglossus bailloni (Vieillot, 1819)

Synonyms
- Andigena bailloni; Baillonius bailloni; Ramphastos Bailloni

= Saffron toucanet =

Species of bird

The saffron toucanet (Pteroglossus bailloni) is a species of bird in the family Ramphastidae found in the Atlantic Forest in far north-eastern Argentina, south-eastern Brazil, and eastern Paraguay.

== Taxonomy and systematics ==
This species' scientific name honors Louis Antoine François Baillon. The saffron toucanet was originally described in the genus Ramphastos and has also been placed in the genus Andigena by some authorities. It was formerly placed in the monotypic genus Baillonius, but Kimura et al. (2004) were able to show that the saffron toucanet belongs in the genus Pteroglossus.

In a later study, it was later confirmed by analyzing the molecular sequence of the saffron by Pereira et al. (2008). The finding was supported by vocalization and anatomical characteristics that were similar to other Pteroglossus species.

Alternate names include Baillon's toucan, banana toucan, saffron-colored araçari and yellow toucanet.

== Description ==
It is a relatively long-tailed toucan with a total length of 35–40 cm (14–15.5 in). As suggested by its common name, it is, uniquely among toucans, overall saffron yellow. The back and tail are darker, more olive in color. The rump, ocular skin and patches on the basal half of the otherwise greenish-horn bill are red. The iris is pale yellowish.

This species is dimorphic, meaning that males and females have distinguished looks from each other. The adult male has a golden head and breast, olive mantle (the wings, shoulder feathers and back) and red rump. They have a modestly sized bill, with green, grey blue, and yellowish-grey color all along it. Adult females are similar to the male but have more olive and less gold coloration; they also have a shorter bill. A young toucanet is mostly olive and grey colored, with brown eyes and a blotchy bill.

== Distribution and habitat ==
The saffron is found in the Atlantic Forest. The viridis group, a superspecies group that includes the saffron, was separated from the other Pteroglossus group around 3 million years ago. The topologies observed in the study showed the saffron toucanet as a member of the Pteroglossus viridis group instead of a sister lineage to all other Pteroglossus. The saffron is separated from the other species in the viridis group by the Brazilian savanna biome. It is thought that this species is part of an ancient stock that became isolated in the current Atlantic Forest from marine transgression and were not able to adapt and invade the Brazilian savanna.

It depends on forested habitats to survive. One study investigated whether species endemic to the Atlantic forest and with small geographic ranges were more vulnerable to forest fragmentation. This species was found to be "endemic and high sensitivity" to the fragmentation, meaning that since they are native to the land, they are more likely to be affected by the split. It was found that species at the edges of their ranges were sensitive to fragmentation as well. This may be due to fewer nearby populations for species to move to once their local populations were lost.

== Behavior and ecology ==
The saffron is a large-gape frugivore. Due to their nature, they are especially crucial for plants with larger seeds to disperse themselves to further areas. They are one of the few birds that are capable of carrying larger seeds to new locations. One study suggests that there is a strong association between species' contribution to network modularity and species' number of interactions. Species with many links tend to establish interactions both within and among environments and to exhibit a greater contribution to nestedness.

On average, species that contribute more to network organization, like the saffron, are at a higher risk of extinction. Without a connection between certain species of plant, there may be ecological and evolutionary consequences such as co-extinction.

=== Breeding ===
The saffron toucanet has been observed making nests beginning in October. The highest numbers of active nests were recorded in November. Their nests had a cavity depth of 20.0 – 68.0 cm, an entrance diameter of 4.3 – 7.4 cm, and a cavity height of 7.0 – 24.0 meters. Due to their small size, they do not need large cavities for their nests and they do not need to compete with other species for suitable spots. They prefer making their nests in living trees such as the Garapa (Apuleia leiocarpa) and the Aspidosperma australe. The diameter at breast height (DBH) was between 44 – 132 cm. They do not tend to reuse the same cavities for their nests.

Courtship for these birds involves the male singing and feeding the female. They will preen each other. The female will lay two or three eggs that are incubated by both parents for about 16 days.

=== Food and feeding ===
The diet of the saffron mainly consists of fruit, like figs and palm fruits. They have also been noted to eat young birds. In one study, a saffron toucanet was observed entering a red-rumped cacique nest, removing the nest contents by swallowing them, and flew away. All of this occurred within 30 seconds. It is thought that their smaller bodies helped them be able to perch on the nest, enter and exit quickly. Another study saw one unsuccessfully attempt to attack the nest of a White-spotted Woodpecker.

== Status ==
It is threatened by habitat loss, degradation, hunting, and being captured. They are currently considered Near Threatened by BirdLife International. It occurs in several protected areas, such as the Itatiaia National Park and Intervales State Park; both in south-eastern Brazil.

== Threats ==
Chlamydophila psittaci, a parasitic agent that can be passed between avian species, was specifically studied in the saffron toucanet, along with several of its other relatives. It has been reported in many species of wild birds; however, physical symptoms are not prevalent with this disease. Lack of symptoms can therefore make this disease easier to spread to other birds and to humans. In the saffron, it had antibodies made to fight against this disease. There is a lack of study concerning the toucanet in veterinary literature, so there is an interest in further study.

In São Paulo Zoo Foundation, the hemoparasite microfilarie was found in one of the saffrons tested. Otherwise, there were no infections of enteroparasites found in the species. Birds in captivity are more likely to contract a disease than wild birds, so they should be tested regularly.

Along with parasitic dangers, the species must endure man made threats. They are a popular choice for the illegal bird trade. They are also in danger from being hunted by humans. Due to deforestation, they are prone to local extinction in smaller forest fragments. Managers are working to reduce the loss of biodiversity with their large reserves.

== Conservation ==
As of 1995, there is only 6% of the Atlantic Forest still alive, with at least 214 endemic species and around 46 species under threat of global extinction. It is therefore extremely important to focus a large amount of conservation efforts here. Food is also being negatively impacted thanks to human intervention. The saffron, along with other species of bird, eats the palmito fruit as a part of its diet. Recently, the palmito industry has boomed, which could impact the dietary habits of the toucanet.

The Fifth Neotropical Ornithological Congress is raising awareness for the conservation of Paraguay forest. Other conservation initiatives like the Private Nature Reserves are growing more popular but are still in need of publicity and financial support. Although they focus mainly on parrots, the World Parrot Trust is educating the public about the importance of conservation in Paraguay and other similarly affected areas.
