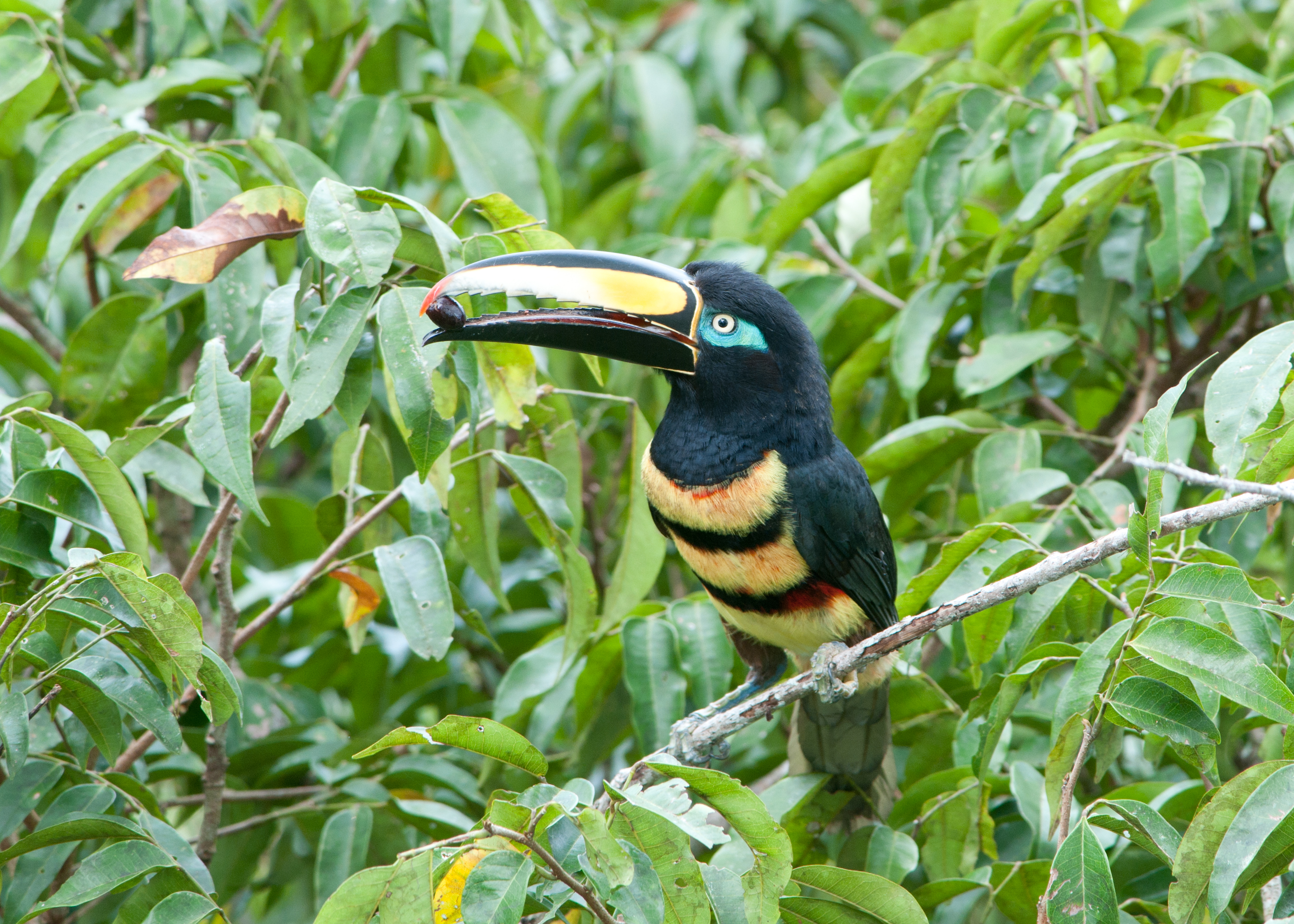

Conservation status
- Least Concern (IUCN 3.1)

Scientific classification
- Kingdom: Animalia
- Phylum: Chordata
- Class: Aves
- Order: Piciformes
- Family: Ramphastidae
- Genus: Pteroglossus
- Species: P. pluricinctus

Binomial name
- Pteroglossus pluricinctus Gould, 1835

= Many-banded aracari =

Species of bird

The many-banded aracari or many-banded araçari (Pteroglossus pluricinctus) is a bird in the toucan family Ramphastidae. It is found in Brazil, Colombia, Ecuador, Peru, and Venezuela.

== Taxonomy and systematics ==
The many-banded aracari is monotypic.

== Description ==
The many-banded aracari is 43 to 46 cm (17 to 18 in) long including the 11 to 12.5 cm (4.3 to 4.9 in) bill. It weighs 215 to 302 g (7.6 to 11 oz). Males' and females' bills are alike in color; the female's is shorter. The bill has an orange-yellow line at its base. Its maxilla is orange-yellow with a wide black stripe on the culmen and a black base. Its mandible is black. Adult males have a mostly black head, throat, and neck but for bare blue-green to green skin around the eye and a chestnut patch behind it. Their back is dark green and their rump is red. Their underparts are yellow with two bands, the upper one black and the lower one black and red. Their thighs are a mix of chestnut, green, and yellow. Adult females have little or no chestnut behind the eye and their black breast band is usually wider than the male's. Immatures are overall duller than adults, especially the yellow. Their bill is gray, brown, horn, and black without the yellow basal line. Their thighs are green.

== Distribution and habitat ==
The many-banded aracari is found from northeastern Colombia and northwestern and southeastern Venezuela south through eastern Ecuador to northeastern Peru and east into northwestern Brazil north of the Amazon River and east to Roraima state. It primarily inhabits terra firme forest and to a lesser degree várzea and gallery forests. It mostly ranges up to 750 m (2,500 ft) of elevation but occurs as high as 1,000 m (3,300 ft).

== Behavior ==
=== Movement ===
The many-banded aracari is believed to be a year-round resident throughout its range.

=== Feeding ===
The many-banded aracari forages singly, in pairs, or in small groups. It is primarily frugivorous and also includes insects, small birds and bird eggs, and lizards in its diet. It plays a role in seed dispersal of fruits with a dispersion range of hundreds of meters. It is likely to regurgitate seeds as opposed to excreting them.

=== Breeding ===
The many-banded aracari's breeding season is thought to be between November and March in Colombia and Ecuador and from March to October in the rest of its range. Nothing else is known about its breeding biology.

=== Vocalization ===
The many-banded aracari's calls are variously described as "seeent", "seeet", "see-yeet", "kyseek", and "kyeek".

== Status ==
The IUCN has assessed the many-banded aracari as being of Least Concern. It has a very large range but its population size is not known and is believed to be decreasing. It is described as "fairly common" from Colombia to Peru but is not well known elsewhere. It occurs in several protected areas. " Lack of information on its biology and population ecology would be serious handicaps if [the] species comes to need any protective action."
