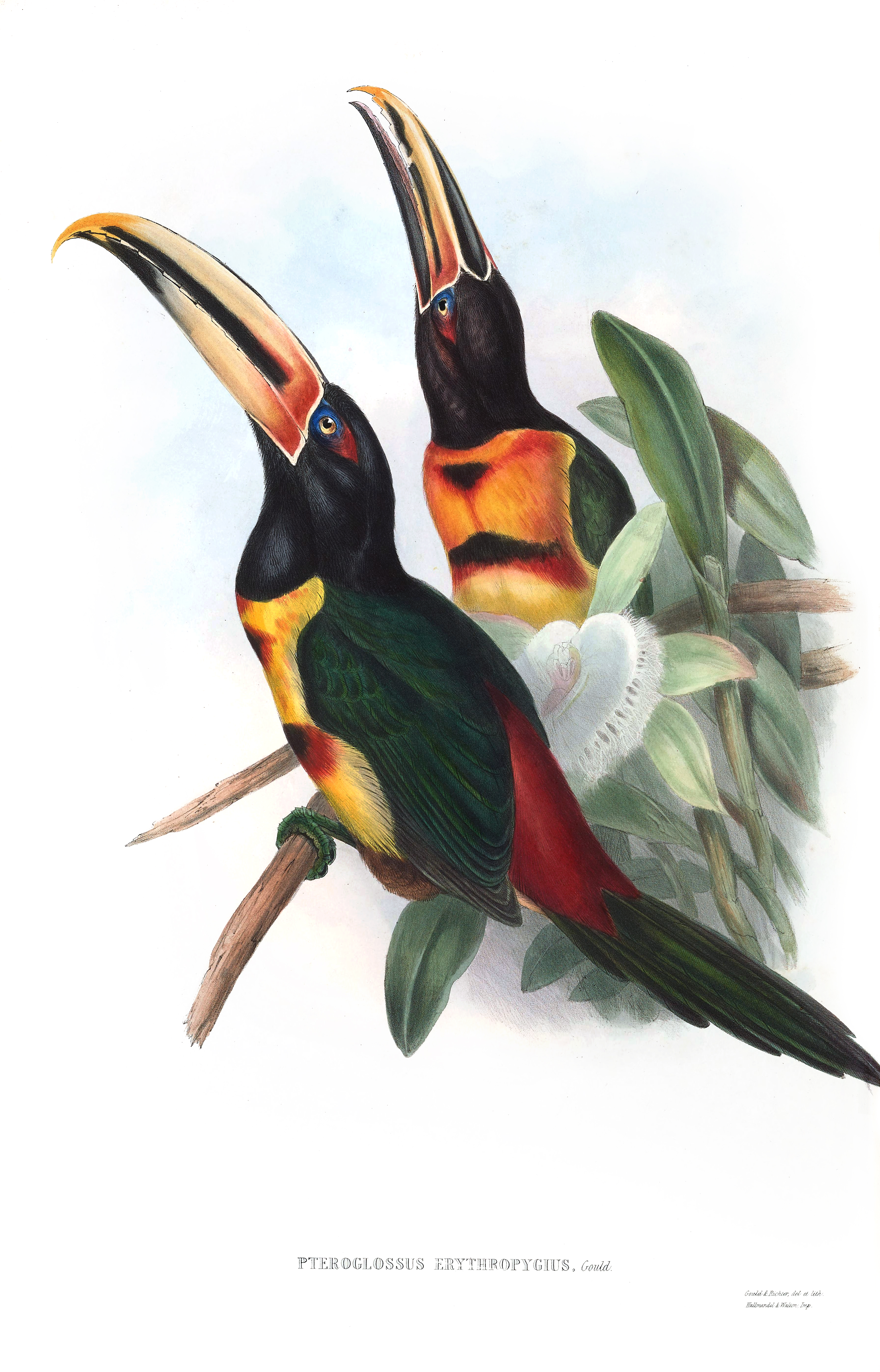
- Pale-mandibled aracari Pteroglossus erythropygius

Scientific classification
- Kingdom: Animalia
- Phylum: Chordata
- Class: Aves
- Order: Piciformes
- Family: Ramphastidae
- Genus: Pteroglossus; Illiger, 1811

Type species
- Ramphastos aracari (black-necked aracari) Linnaeus, 1758

Synonyms
- List: Aracarius Rafinesque, 1815; Aracari Lesson, 1828; Grammarhynchus Gould, 1854; Grammatorhynchus [missp.] Bonaparte, 1854; Pyrosterna Bonaparte, 1854; Baillonius Cassin, 1868; Baillonicus [missp.] Klös, 1970; Beauharnaisius Bonaparte, 1850; Bauharnaisius [missp.] Bonaparte, 1850; Beauharnasius [missp.] Gould, 1854; Beauharnesius [missp.] Bonaparte, 1854; Beauharnisius [missp.] Sundevall, 1873; Ulocomus Heine, 1890

= Aracari =

Aracaris

Genus of birds

Aracari or araçari (US: /ˌɑːrəˈsɑːri/ AR-ə-SAR-ee, UK: /ˌærəˈsɑːri/ ARR-ə-SAR-ee, /-ˈkɑːri/ -KAR-ee) are medium-sized toucans that, together with the saffron toucanet, make up the genus Pteroglossus.

They are brightly plumaged and have enormous, contrastingly patterned bills. They live in forests and woodlands of the Neotropics.

== Taxonomy ==
The genus Pteroglossus was introduced in 1811 by the German zoologist Johann Karl Wilhelm Illiger. The name combines the Ancient Greek pteron meaning "feather" with glōssa meaning "tongue". George Robert Gray designated the black-necked aracari as the type species of the genus in 1840.

The name "Aracari" was used in 1648 by the German naturalist Georg Marcgrave for the black-necked aracari in his book Historia Naturalis Brasiliae. The name comes from the word Arassari, the name of the bird in the Tupi language.

One species, the distinctive saffron toucanet, was formerly placed in the monotypic genus Baillonius, but Renato Kimura and collaborators showed in 2004 that it belongs in the genus Pteroglossus.

The cladogram below is based on a molecular phylogenetic study by Swati Patel and collaborators that was published in 2010.

- Pteroglossus
  - - Saffron toucanet (Pteroglossus bailloni)
    - - Green aracari (Pteroglossus viridis)
      - Lettered aracari (Pteroglossus inscriptus)
  - - - Collared aracari (Pteroglossus torquatus)
      - - Fiery-billed aracari (Pteroglossus frantzii)
        - Pale-mandibled aracari (Pteroglossus erythropygius)
    - - - Black-necked aracari (Pteroglossus aracari)
        - - Many-banded aracari (Pteroglossus pluricinctus)
          - Chestnut-eared aracari (Pteroglossus castanotis)
      - - Ivory-billed aracari (Pteroglossus azara)
        - - Curl-crested aracari (Pteroglossus beauharnaeslii)
          - Red-necked aracari (Pteroglossus bitorquatus)

=== Extant species ===
Twelve species are considered to belong to the genus Pteroglossus:

Image	Scientific name	Common name	Distribution
	Pteroglossus viridis	Green aracari	lowland forests of northeastern South America (the Guiana Shield), in the northeast Amazon Basin, the Guianas and the eastern Orinoco River drainage of Venezuela
	Pteroglossus inscriptus	Lettered aracari	Bolivia, Brazil, Colombia, Ecuador, and Peru
	Pteroglossus bitorquatus	Red-necked aracari	Bolivia and Brazil
	Pteroglossus azara	Ivory-billed aracari	Bolivia, Brazil, Colombia, Ecuador, Peru, and Venezuela
	Pteroglossus aracari	Black-necked aracari	Brazil, French Guiana, Guyana, Suriname, and Venezuela
	Pteroglossus castanotis	Chestnut-eared aracari	Amazon Basin, Paraguay, Bolivia, southeastern Brazil and the extreme northeast of Argentina
	Pteroglossus pluricinctus	Many-banded aracari	Brazil, Colombia, Ecuador, Peru, and Venezuela
	Pteroglossus torquatus	Collared aracari	southern Mexico to Panama; also Ecuador, Colombia, Venezuela and Costa Rica
	Pteroglossus erythropygius	Pale-mandibled aracari	Panama, western Colombia, Ecuador and northwestern Peru
	Pteroglossus frantzii	Fiery-billed aracari	southern Costa Rica and western Panama
	Pteroglossus beauharnaisii	Curl-crested aracari	Amazon Basin
	Pteroglossus bailloni	Saffron toucanet	Brazil

=== Former species ===
Some authorities, either presently or formerly, recognize additional species or subspecies as species belonging to the genus Pteroglossus including:

- Wagler's toucanet (as Pteroglossus wagleri)
- Emerald toucanet (as Pteroglossus prasinus)
- White-throated toucanet (as Pteroglossus albivitta)
- Black-throated toucanet (as Pteroglossus atrogularis)
- Groove-billed toucanet (as Pteroglossus sulcatus)
- Crimson-rumped toucanet (as Pteroglossus haematopygus)
- Guianan toucanet (as Pteroglossus Culik)
- Golden-collared toucanet (as Pteroglossus reinwardtii)
- Langsdorff's toucanet (as Pteroglossus langsdorffii)
- Tawny-tufted toucanet (as Pteroglossus nattereri)
- Gould's toucanet (as Pteroglossus gouldii)
- Spot-billed toucanet (as Pteroglossus maculirostris)
- Gray-breasted mountain toucan (as Pteroglossus hypoglaucus)
- Hooded mountain toucan (as Pteroglossus cucullatus)
- Black-billed mountain toucan (as Pteroglossus nigrirostris)

== Behaviour and ecology ==
Some species of aracaris are unusual for toucans in that they roost socially throughout the year, up to six adults and fledged young sleeping in the same hole with tails folded over their backs.

=== Breeding ===
They are arboreal and nest in tree holes laying 2–4 white eggs.

=== Food and feeding ===
All the species are basically fruit-eating, but will take insects and other small prey.

== Threats ==
The ischnoceran louse Austrophilopterus flavirostris is suspected to parasitize most if not all species of aracaris, with the possible exception of the green aracari (Price & Weckstein 2005).
