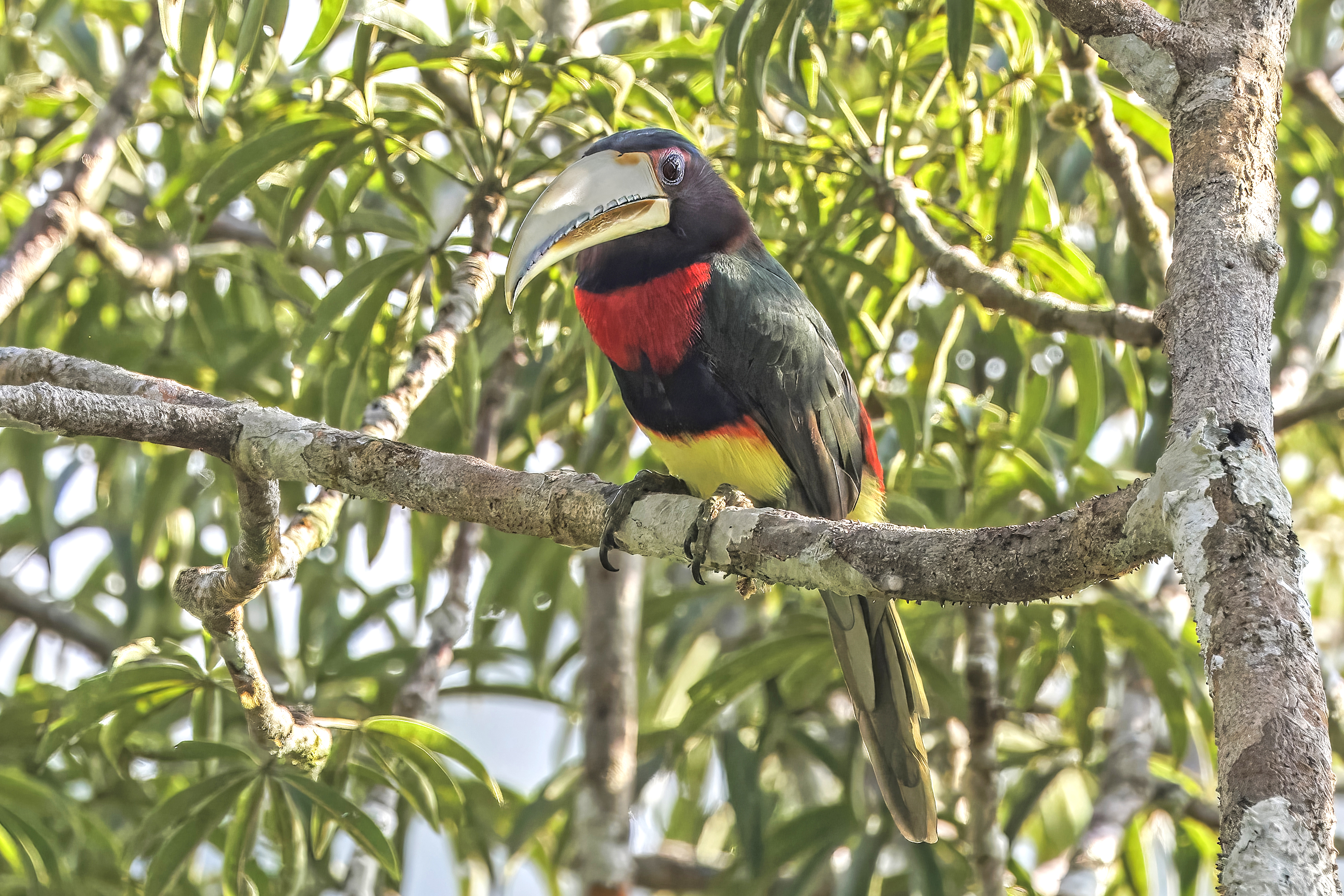
- P. a. flavirostris, Ecuador

Conservation status
- Least Concern (IUCN 3.1)

Scientific classification
- Kingdom: Animalia
- Phylum: Chordata
- Class: Aves
- Order: Piciformes
- Family: Ramphastidae
- Genus: Pteroglossus
- Species: P. azara

Binomial name
- Pteroglossus azara (Vieillot, 1819)

Subspecies
- See text
- Range

Synonyms
- Ramphastos azara

= Ivory-billed aracari =

Species of bird

The ivory-billed aracari or ivory-billed araçari (Pteroglossus azara) is a bird in the toucan family Ramphastidae. It is found in Brazil, Colombia, Ecuador, Peru, and Venezuela.

== Taxonomy ==
The ivory-billed aracari was formally described in 1819 by the French ornithologist Louis Vieillot under the binomial name Ramphastos azara. Vieillot based his account on "Le Toucan-Aracari, Azara" from Brazil that had been described and illustrated in 1807 by the French naturalist François Levaillant. The epithet azara was chosen to honour the Spanish soldier and naturalist Félix de Azara. The ivory-billed aracari is now one of 13 species placed in the genus Pteroglossus that was introduced in 1811 by the German zoologist Johann Karl Wilhelm Illiger.

Three subspecies are recognised:

- P. a. flavirostris Fraser, 1841 – west Amazonia
- P. a. azara (Vieillot, 1819) – northwest Amazonian Brazil
- P. a. mariae Gould, 1854 – southwest Amazonia (brown-mandibled aracari)

The subspecies P. a. mariae has sometimes been considered as a separate species, the brown-mandibled aracari.

== Description ==
The ivory-billed aracari is 36 to 45 cm (14 to 18 in) long and weighs 120 to 160 g (4.2 to 5.6 oz). The two subspecies (and the brown-mandibled species) do not differ appreciably in length, weight, or plumage but only in bill color. Adult males have a black cap above a chestnut head and throat, maroon-red nape and upper back, green lower back, and red rump. They have a narrow black band under the throat, a wide red band on the upper breast, a wide black band on the lower breast, a yellow belly, and green thighs. Adult females have a dark brown cap and a narrower black band below the throat than males.

The nominate subspecies' bill is mostly yellow, with a deep red to brown line on the maxilla that is broad at the base and tapers to a black tip. It has red, black, and ivory markings along its edge that resemble teeth. P. a. flavirostris' bill has a yellow to ivory maxilla with an orange spot under the nostril, black and white "teeth", and a yellow to ivory mandible with a narrow orange-brown line down its middle.

== Distribution and habitat ==
The nominate subspecies of ivory-billed aracari is found in the Brazilian state of Amazonas between the left bank of the Rio Solimões (upper Amazon) and the right bank of the Rio Negro. P. a. flavirostris is found in southeastern Colombia, southern Venezuela, eastern Ecuador, northeastern Peru, and northwestern Brazil with some overlap with the nominate. The species inhabits a variety of forest landscapes including varzea, gallery forest, and secondary forest, and to a lesser extent terra firme, bamboo, cloudforest, and plantations. It is more common in early- to mid-successional forest than mature. In elevation it is mostly found below 600 m (2,000 ft) but is regularly found to 900 m (3,000 ft) and locally to 600 m (2,000 ft) in the Ecuador-Bolivia border area. It is believed to be a year-round resident throughout its range.

== Behavior ==
=== Food and feeding ===
The ivory-billed aracari forages in the forest's upper level and the canopy, typically in pairs or in a small group. There are few details known of its diet but it appears to be mostly fruit with some arthropods.

=== Breeding ===
The ivory-billed aracari's breeding season spans from December to May in most of its range but is from February to August in the western and southwestern parts of it. It is assumed to nest in tree cavities like other toucans. Its clutch size is two to four eggs. Nothing else is known about its breeding biology.

=== Vocalization ===
What is thought to be the ivory-billed aracari's song is "a series of 2–6 wailing 'twaaa-a-a' or 'tweee-ee' or 'traaa-at' notes". Other vocalizations include "rattles, grunt-like contact notes, nasal 'nyek', purr-like notes, 'kyeek' alarm, [and] pure rattles 'bddddt'".

== Coservation status ==
The International Union for Conservation of Nature (IUCN) has categorised the ivory-billed aracari as being of least concern. It has a very large range, and though its population size is not known it is believed to be stable. No immeditate threats have been identified. The "[v]aried habitats utilized and changing nature of its successional habitats suggest that [the] species is not likely to become threatened in near future.
