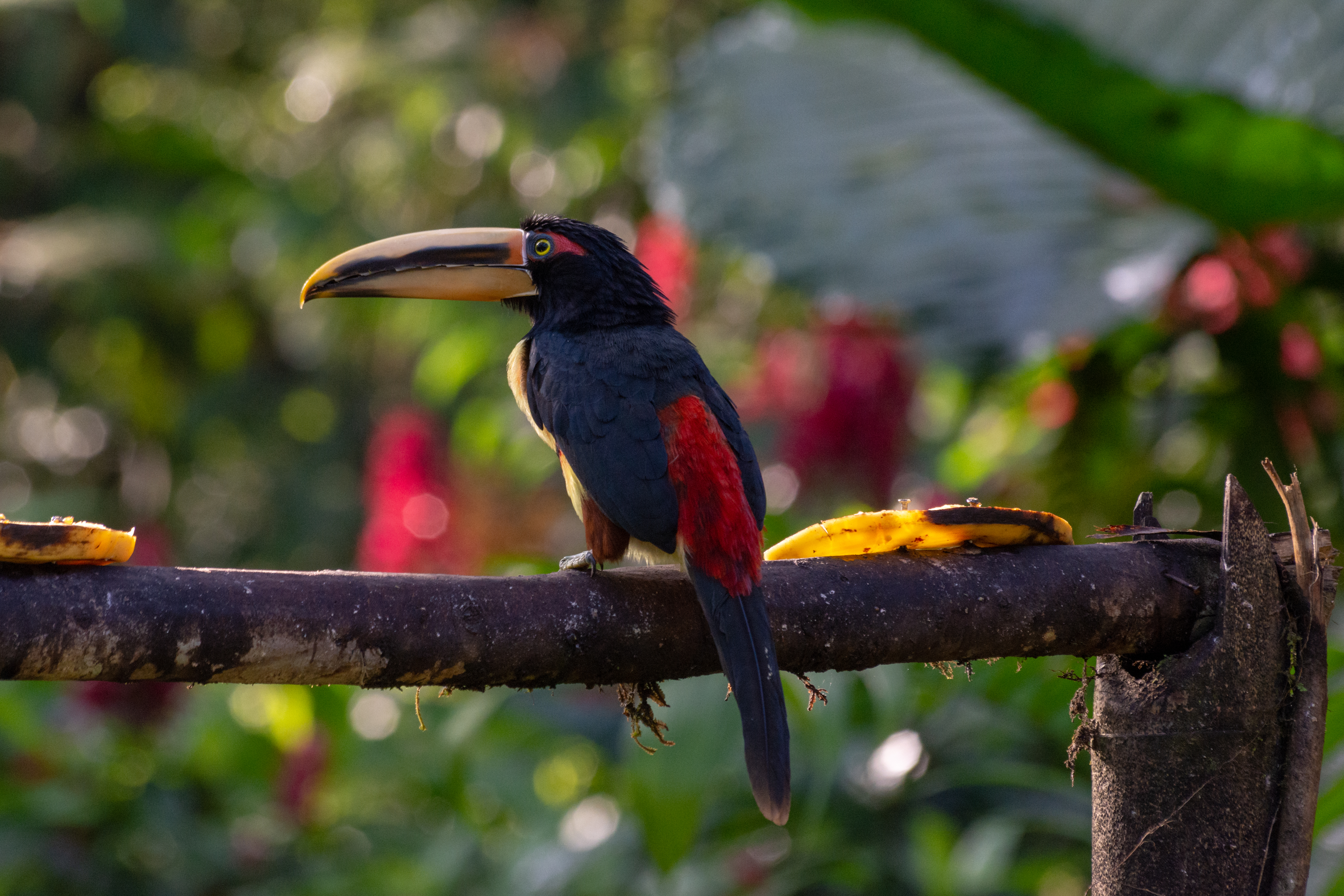
- At Mindo cloud forest, Ecuador

Conservation status
- Least Concern (IUCN 3.1)

Scientific classification
- Kingdom: Animalia
- Phylum: Chordata
- Class: Aves
- Order: Piciformes
- Family: Ramphastidae
- Genus: Pteroglossus
- Species: P. erythropygius

Binomial name
- Pteroglossus erythropygius Gould, 1843

Synonyms
- Pteroglossus torquatus erythropygius

= Pale-mandibled aracari =

Species of bird

The pale-mandibled aracari or pale-billed araçari (Pteroglossus erythropygius) is a bird in the toucan family Ramphastidae. It is found in southern Panama, western Colombia, Ecuador and northwestern Peru.

== Taxonomy and systematics ==
The pale-mandibled aracari was formally described in 1843 as Pteroglossus erythropygius by the English ornithologist John Gould based on a specimen in the collection of the British naval officer Edward Belcher. The specific epithet combines the Ancient Greek ερυθρος/eruthros meaning "red" with -πυγιος/-pugios meaning "-rumped". Gould did not specify a type locality but this has been designated as Ecuador.

Two subspecies are recognised:

- P. e. sanguineus Gould, J, 1854 – eastern Panama and northern Colombia southward to northwestern Ecuador (northern Esmeraldas and adjacent Imbabura)
- P. e. erythropygius Gould, J, 1843 – western Ecuador (western Esmeraldas southward to El Oro) and northwestern Peru (eastern Tumbes)

The subspecies P. e. sanguineus has sometimes been treated as a separate species, the stripe-billed aracari.

== Description ==
The pale-mandibled aracari is 40.5 to 43 cm (16 to 17 in) long including its 11.5 to 12.5 cm (4.5 to 4.9 in) bill. It weighs 175 to 250 g (6.2 to 8.8 oz). Males and females have the same coloration of the bill and plumage but the female's bill is shorter than the male's. The adult's bill has a narrow vertical white line at its base. Its maxilla is creamy yellow with a black stripe along its lower edge. The bill's mandible is creamy yellow with a black tip. Adults have mostly glossy black upperparts with bright red lower back, rump, and uppertail coverts. Their head, throat, and uppermost breast are greenish black. Their lower breast, belly, and undertail coverts are yellow. The breast has a variable red wash and a black spot in its center; the upper belly is crossed by a narrow red and black band. Their thighs are brown. Juveniles are much duller than adults, with a sooty-black head and chest and brownish olive upperparts. The red rump and yellow underparts are paler, and the breast spot, belly band, and bill pattern are indistinct.

== Distribution and habitat ==
The pale-mandibled aracari is found from southern Panama south to Peru's Department of Tumbes. It inhabits the interior and edges of evergreen primary forest and mature secondary forest and also coffee, cacao, and fruit plantations.

== Behavior ==
=== Social behavior ===
Pale-mandibled aracaris typically travel in groups of about six to eight or more individuals that sometimes include other toucan species. They also roost communally; up to seven may occupy a cavity overnight.

=== Feeding ===
The pale-mandibled aracari's diet is mostly fruit but it also feeds on large insects, the eggs and nestlings of other birds, and other small vertebrates. It mostly forages from the forest's mid level to the canopy but will feed on fruits in the understory. They glean fruit by stretching from a perch, bending, and even hanging upside down. They regurgitate large fruit seeds which often remain viable.

=== Breeding ===
The pale-mandibled aracari's breeding season is from December to May. It nests in tree cavities, usually those excavated by large woodpeckers but also natural ones. They may enlarge the cavity, which can be up to 30 m (98 ft) above the ground. The clutch size is usually three eggs but can be as large as five. The incubation period is 16 to 17 days and both parents incubate. Fledging occurs 26 to 30 days after hatch. The parents and often up to three other adults provision the nestlings. They are fed mostly with insects when young.

=== Vocalization ===
The pale-mandibled aracari's usual call is "a loud, arresting, high-pitched, and squeaky 'ksisik' or 'ksiyik!'."

== Conservation status ==
The IUCN has assessed the pale-mandibled aracari as being of Least Concern, though its population size is not known and is believed to be decreasing. No immediate threats have been identified. "[A]lthough it tolerates secondary forest, it nonetheless is very susceptible to deforestation".

== Gallery ==
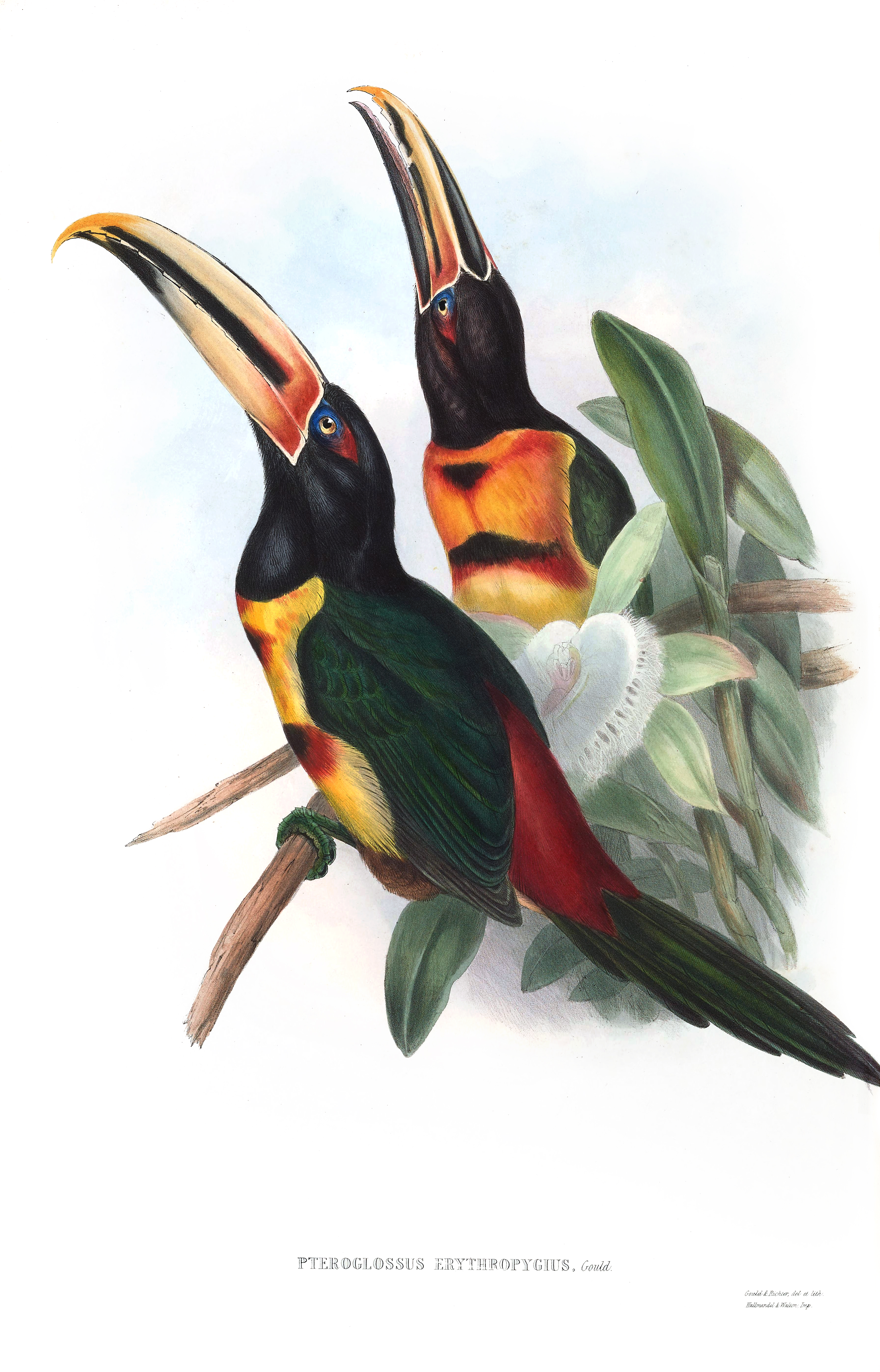

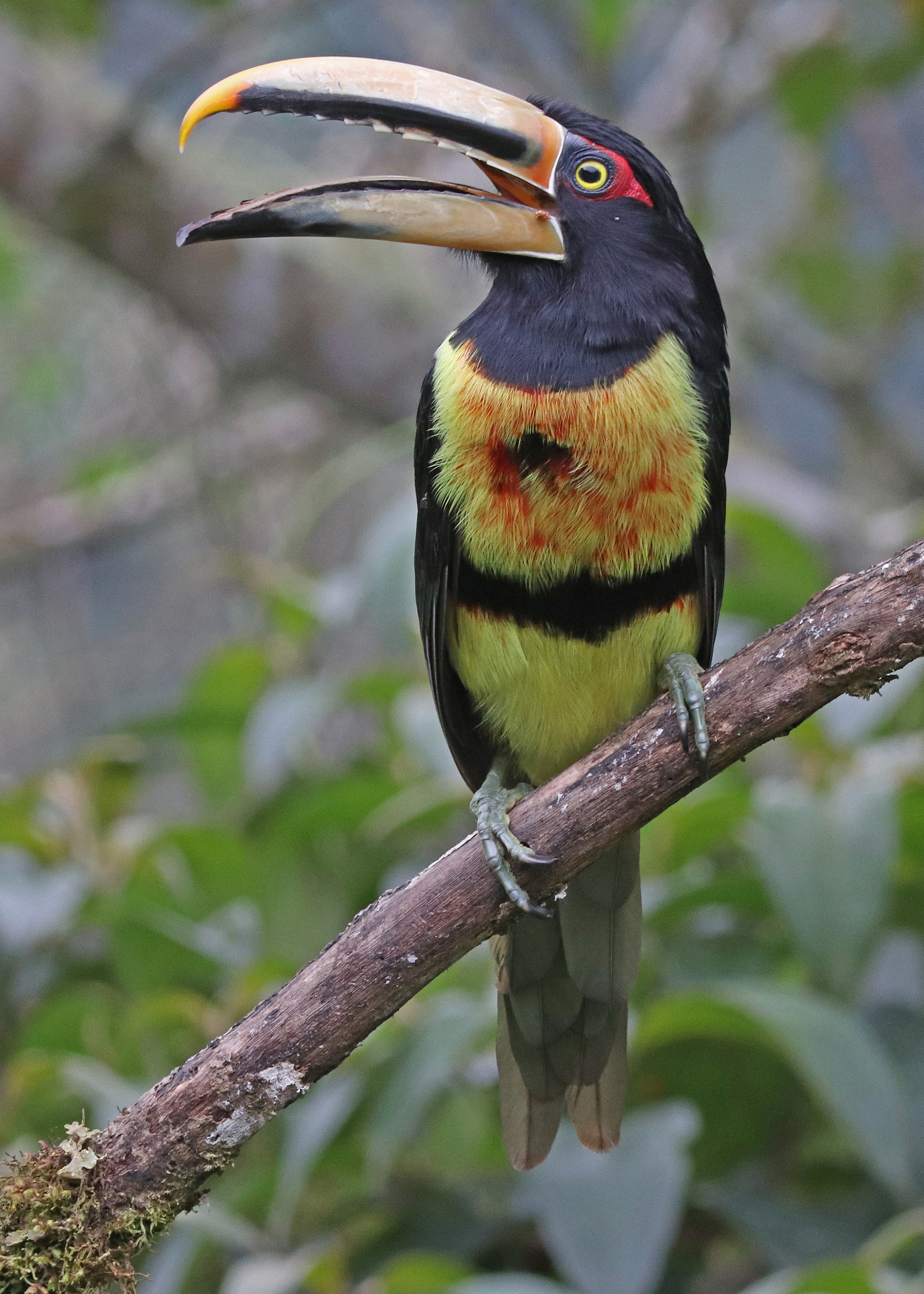

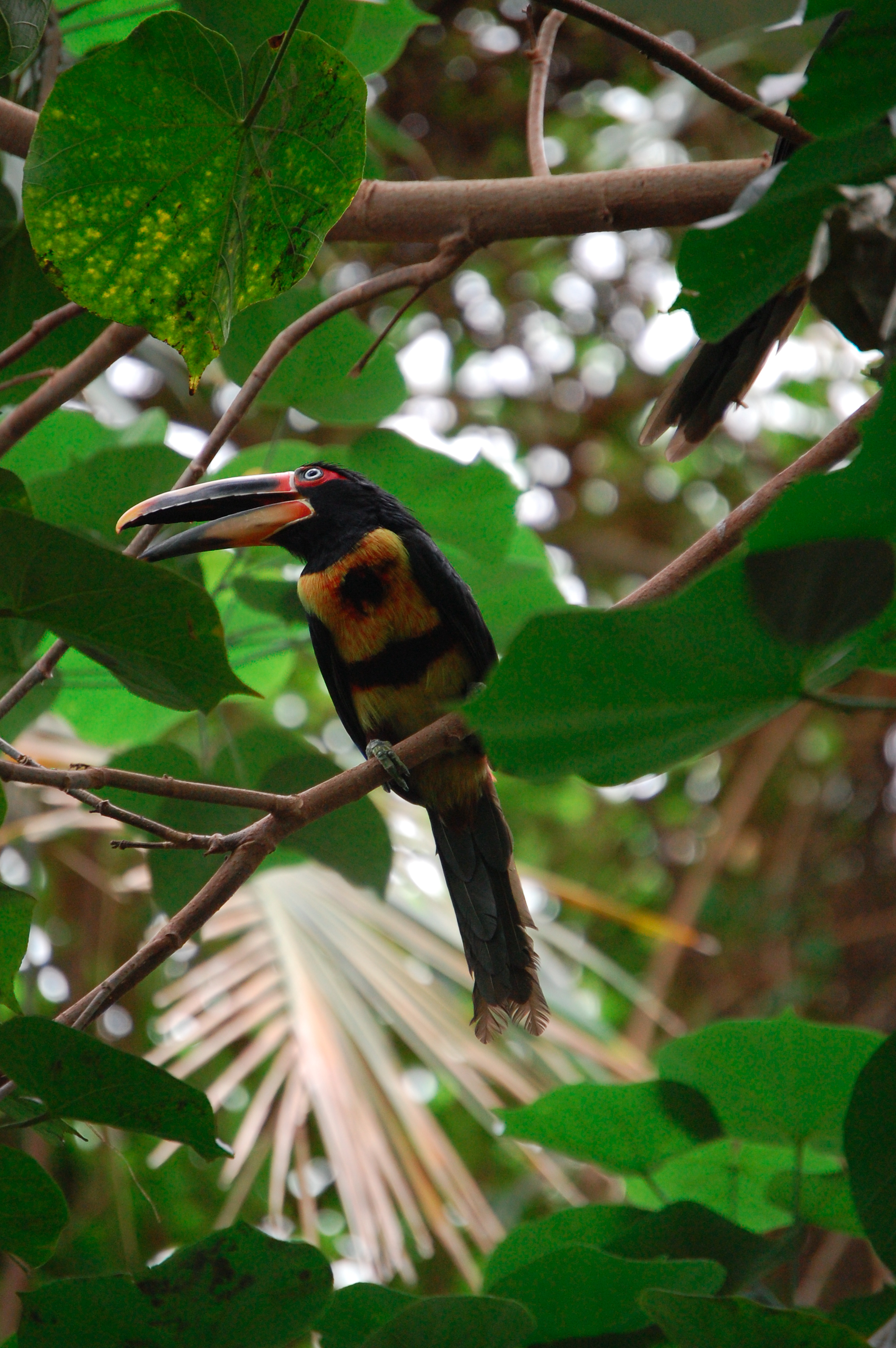
