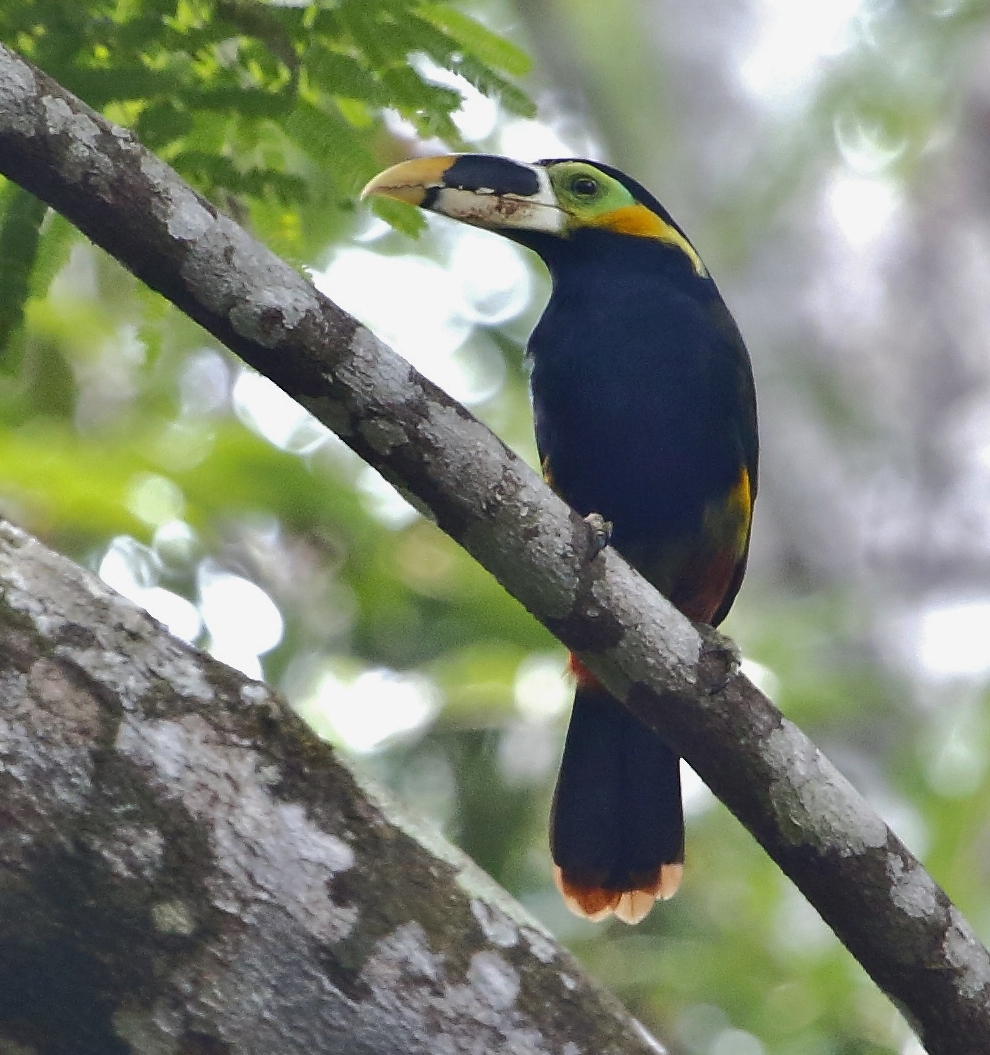

Conservation status
- Least Concern (IUCN 3.1)

Scientific classification
- Kingdom: Animalia
- Phylum: Chordata
- Class: Aves
- Order: Piciformes
- Family: Ramphastidae
- Genus: Selenidera
- Species: S. gouldii

Binomial name
- Selenidera gouldii (Natterer, 1837)

Synonyms
- Pteroglossus gouldii

= Gould's toucanet =

Species of bird

Gould's toucanet (Selenidera gouldii) is a bird in the toucan family Ramphastidae. It is found in Bolivia and Brazil.

== Taxonomy and systematics ==
The tawny-tufted toucanet was originally described in the genus Pteroglossus. It has at times been considered conspecific with the spot-billed toucanet (S. maculirostris) and the two are sister species. It is monotypic.

The species' common name commemorates the English ornithologist and bird artist John Gould (1804–1881).

== Description ==
Gould's toucanet is about 33 cm (13 in) long. Males weigh 138 to 209 g (4.9 to 7.4 oz) and females 131 to 183 g (4.6 to 6.5 oz). Males and females have the same bill pattern but the female's bill is shorter. The bill's maxilla has a narrow white base, a black middle, an orange-yellow outer third, and ivory "teeth" along the tomium. The mandible's inner half is ivory with a thin black area between it and the outer end's orange-yellow. Both sexes have bare green-yellow to blue skin around the eye and a golden-yellow tuft of feathers behind it; both are paler in the female. Adult males have a black head, nape, chin, throat, and belly. Their upperparts are green with a yellow band on the lower neck. Their tail is green with chestnut tips on the central one to three pairs of feathers. Their flanks are yellow and their undertail coverts are red. Females have chestnut where the male has black, yellower flanks, and a narrower yellow band on the back. Immatures are duller overall, usually without a yellow band on the back, and their bill's pattern is not sharp.

== Distribution and habitat ==
Gould's toucanet is found in central and eastern Brazil south of the Amazon River between the Madeira River and the Atlantic ocean in the state of Ceará, and from there south as far as eastern Bolivia and the Brazilian state of Mato Grosso. It inhabits a variety of tropical forest types, primarily wet lowland and gallery forest but also palm, deciduous, and secondary forest. It favors tall forest (up to 40 m (130 ft) high) but on sandy soils occurs in areas with shorter trees. In elevation it ranges as high as 800 m (2,600 ft) in eastern Amazonia.

== Behavior ==
=== Movement ===
As far as is known, Gould's toucanet is a year-round resident throughout its range.

=== Feeding ===
Gould's toucanet forages from the forest's undergrowth to its canopy, typically in pairs or groups of up to four. Its diet is known to include fruit and some animal matter but details are lacking.

=== Breeding ===
Gould's toucanet's breeding season is thought to be between May and September but somewhat shorter in the western part of its range. Its nest, eggs, incubation period, and time to fledging are not known.

=== Vocalization ===
Gould's toucanet makes a "[s]eries of 'ggrawnk' to 'ggrraaw' notes". Its vocalization has also been described as a "very low, croaking, 'porc-porc-porc- -'."

== Status ==
The IUCN has assessed Gould's toucanet as being of Least Concern. It has a large range but its population size is not known and is believed to be decreasing. No immediate threats have been identified. "This species' ability to use second growth should favour it. Details of breeding and ecology are needed for possible monitoring."
