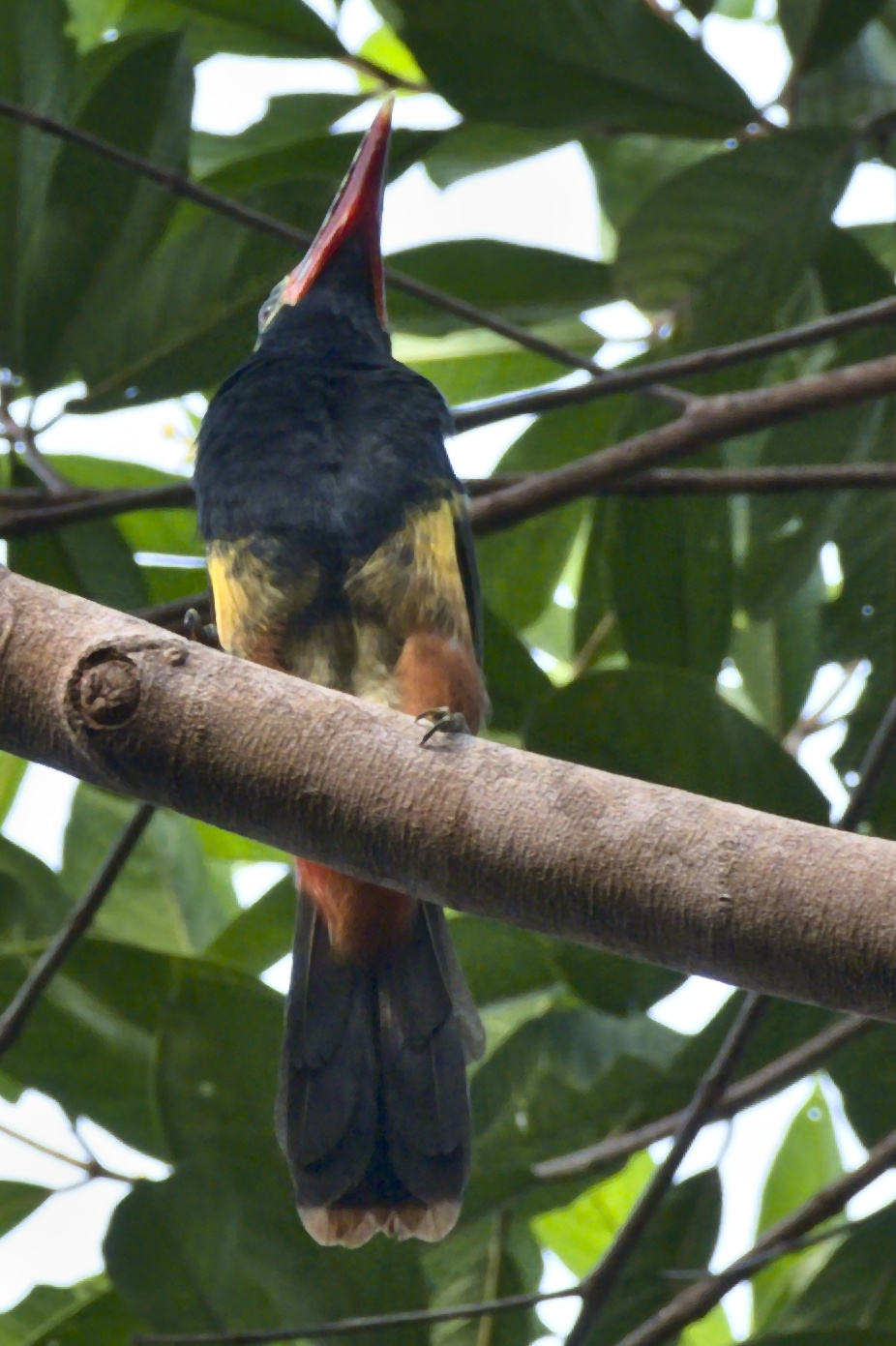

Conservation status
- Least Concern (IUCN 3.1)

Scientific classification
- Kingdom: Animalia
- Phylum: Chordata
- Class: Aves
- Order: Piciformes
- Family: Ramphastidae
- Genus: Selenidera
- Species: S. nattereri

Binomial name
- Selenidera nattereri (Gould, 1835)

Synonyms
- Pteroglossus nattereri

= Tawny-tufted toucanet =

Species of bird

The tawny-tufted toucanet (Selenidera nattereri) is a bird in the toucan family Ramphastidae. It is found in Brazil, Colombia, Venezuela, and possible Guyana.

== Taxonomy and systematics ==
The tawny-tufted toucanet was originally described in the genus Pteroglossus. It is monotypic.

== Description ==
The tawny-tufted toucanet is 32 to 33 cm (13 to 13 in) long and weighs 148 to 165 g (5.2 to 5.8 oz). Males and females have the same bill pattern but the female's bill is shorter. The bill has a vertical red line at its base. Its culmen is green to lime green; the rest of the maxilla is red but for a blue patch near the base and pale "teeth" along the tomium. The mandible is mostly brownish red (sometimes greenish horn-colored) with a blue patch near the base, a green tip, and vertical white lines along the mid section. Both sexes have pale blue bare skin around the eye and a yellow to tawny tuft of feathers behind it. Males have a black head, nape, chin, throat, and belly. Their upperparts are green with a yellow band on the lower neck. Their tail is green with chestnut tips on the central three pairs of feathers. Their flanks are yellow to rusty and their undertail coverts are red. Females have a chestnut crown to the shoulders, a rusty chin and belly, greenish yellow flanks, and paler facial skin and tuft than males.

== Distribution and habitat ==
The tawny-tufted toucanet is patchily distributed from extreme eastern Colombia through southern Venezuela into northwestern Brazil north of the Solimões (upper Amazon) River as far east as the upper Rio Negro. Unconfirmed sight records in Guyana lead the South American Classification Committee of the American Ornithological Society to call it hypothetical in that country. It inhabits forests, usually those on sandy soil and near waterways.

== Behavior ==
=== Movement ===
As far as is known, the tawny-tufted toucanet is a year-round resident throughout its range.

=== Feeding ===
The tawny-tufted toucanet's diet is known to include fruit but nothing else is known about its diet or foraging habits.

=== Breeding ===
The tawny-tufted toucanet's breeding season is thought to be between April and November but might start in March and extend only to May. Its nest, eggs, incubation period, and time to fledging are not known.

=== Vocalization ===
The tawny-tufted toucanet makes "grown-like, croaking, 'ggruuukk' notes" that may last 10 to 15 seconds. It also makes a "more rattling version, 'dddrik-'".

== Status ==
The IUCN has assessed the tawny-tufted toucanet as being of Least Concern. It has a large range but its population size and trend are not known. No immediate threats have been identified. "Data [are] urgently needed on its habitat and feeding requirements, as well as on its breeding biology and behaviour."
