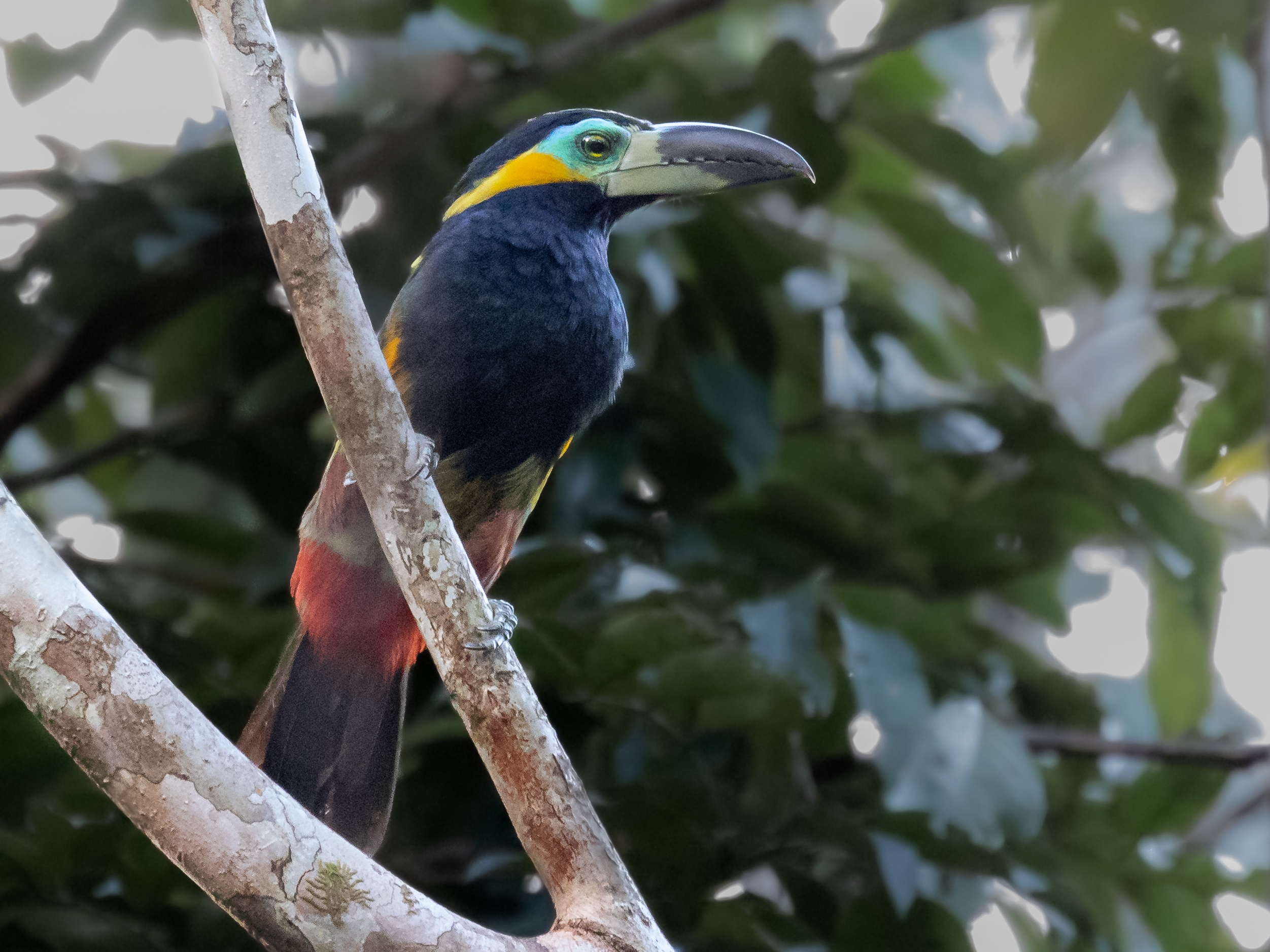
- Male
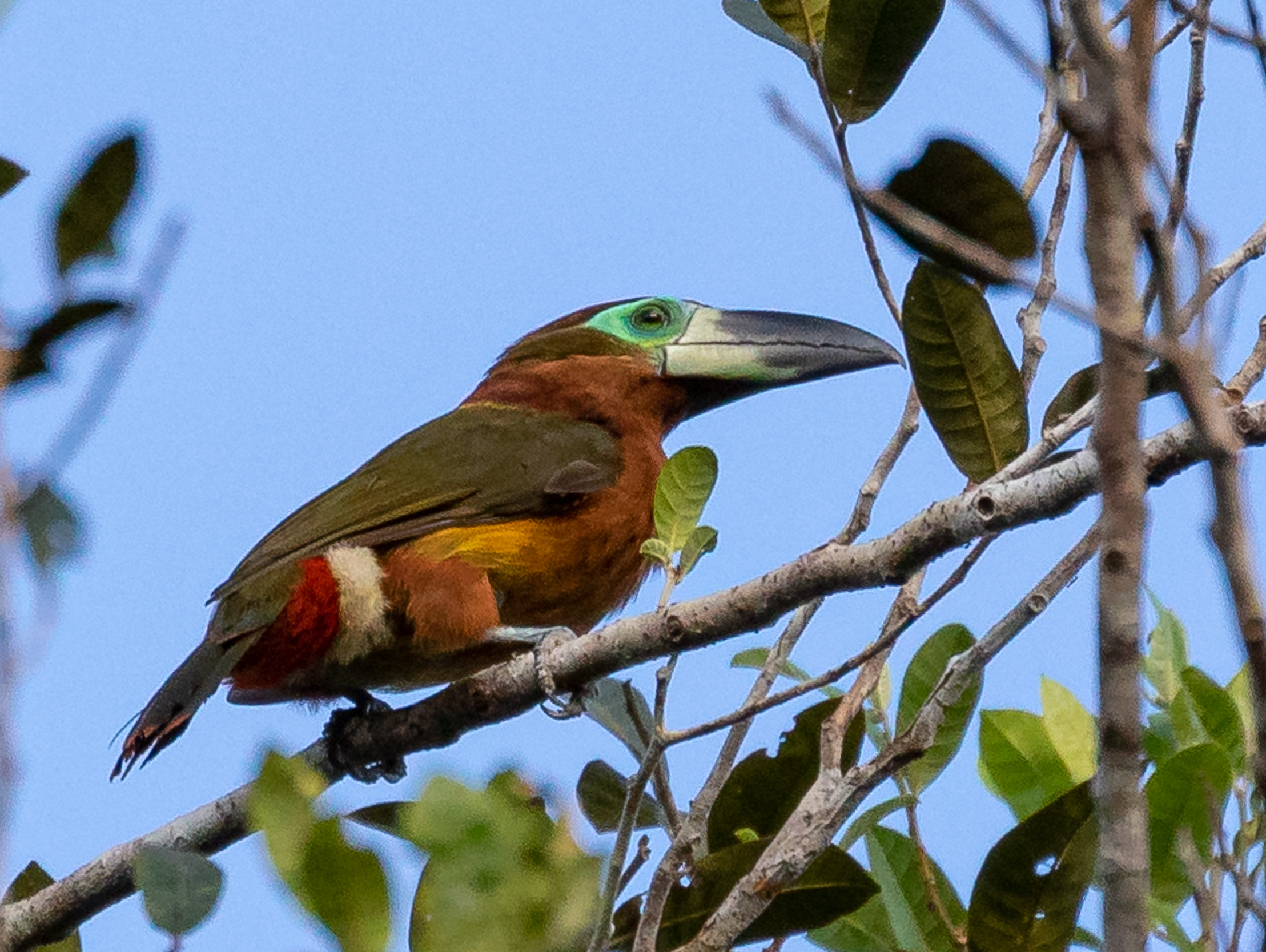
- Female

Conservation status
- Least Concern (IUCN 3.1)

- Least Concern (IUCN 3.1)

Scientific classification
- Kingdom: Animalia
- Phylum: Chordata
- Class: Aves
- Order: Piciformes
- Family: Ramphastidae
- Genus: Selenidera
- Species: S. reinwardtii

Binomial name
- Selenidera reinwardtii (Wagler, 1827)

Subspecies
- See text

Synonyms
- Pteroglossus reinwardtii

= Golden-collared toucanet =

Species of bird

The golden-collared toucanet (Selenidera reinwardtii) is a bird in the toucan family Ramphastidae. It is found in Bolivia, Brazil, Colombia, Ecuador, and Peru.

== Taxonomy and systematics ==
The golden-collared toucanet was originally described in the genus Pteroglossus. The South American Classification Committee of the American Ornithological Society, the International Ornithological Committee (IOC), and the Clements taxonomy recognize two subspecies, the nominate S. r. reinwardtii (Wagler, 1827) and S. r. langsdorffii (Wagler, 1827).

Both subspecies have at times been treated as separate species, and BirdLife International's Handbook of the Birds of the World (HBW) continues to do so. It calls them the "red-billed" and "green-billed" toucanets respectively. The two interbreed where their ranges overlap in Peru.

This article follows the IOC et al. two-subspecies model.

== Description ==
The golden-collared toucanet is 33 to 35 cm (13 to 14 in) long. The nominate subspecies weighs 129 to 178 g (4.6 to 6.3 oz) and S. r. langsdorffii 134 to 200 g (4.7 to 7.1 oz). The two subspecies have essentially the same plumage. Adult males have a black head, nape, and shoulders. A narrow yellow band separates the black shoulders from the green back. Their tail is green with chestnut tips on the central two or three pairs of feathers. Their eye is surrounded by bare blue skin (greener in S. r. langsdorffii) and a golden-yellow tuft of feathers protrudes behind it. They have mostly black underparts with gold-yellow flanks (more orange in S. r. langsdorffii) and red undertail coverts. Adult females replace the male's black with chestnut; their facial tuft and flanks are duller, and the yellow band on the back is narrower. Immatures are duller overall with rusty undertail coverts.

The golden-collared toucanet subspecies' bills differ; within each the sexes have the same pattern, but the female's is shorter. The nominate's bill has a vertical black line at the base and a black culmen. Most of the bill is red, with approximately the outer third black. The maxilla has black to ivory "teeth" along the tomium. S. r. langsdorffii's bill has a mostly black maxilla with a green base and a roughly half-and-half green and black mandible. However, the bill is sometimes almost entirely black. The tomial "teeth" are creamy to whitish.

== Distribution and habitat ==
The nominate subspecies of golden-collared toucanet is found from south-central and southeastern Colombia (near the Brazilian border) south through eastern Ecuador into north-central and northeastern Peru. (The map shows only this range.) S. r. langsdorffii is found from north-central and northeastern Peru and western Brazil south into northwestern Bolivia. The species inhabits the interior and edges of montane forest, forest in floodplains, and occasionally várzea. It favors drier uplands and shuns secondary forest. In elevation it most commonly ranges up to about 1,000 m (3,300 ft) but occasionally occurs as high as 1,200 m (3,900 ft) in Ecuador, 1,500 m (4,900 ft) in Peru, and 1,300 m (4,300 ft) in Bolivia.

== Behavior ==
=== Movement ===
As far as is known, the golden-collared toucanet is a year-round resident and territorial throughout its range.

=== Feeding ===
The golden-collared toucanet forages singly, in pairs, or in groups of up to four, and from the forest's understory to the canopy. It is known to join mixed-species foraging flocks. Its diet is mostly fruit but also includes insects and possibly small birds. It mostly gleans from foliage and branches but also hawks for flying insects.

=== Breeding ===
The golden-collared toucanet breeds between March and July in Colombia and Ecuador and from June to December in Bolivia, Brazil, and Peru. Males courtship-feed females. It nests in tree cavities. The clutch size is apparently at least three eggs. Nothing else is known about the species' breeding biology.

=== Vocal and non-vocal sounds ===
The golden-collared toucanet's song is "a series of ca. 4–14 ggrraawk notes", and is usually sung singly rather than in duet. It also makes "eh, uh, kik, and other softer sounds." In aggressive encounters it loudly wipes its bill on a branch.

== Status ==
The IUCN follows HBW taxonomy and so has assessed the "red-billed" and "green-billed" toucanets separately. Both are rated as being of Least Concern. Both have large ranges, but their population sizes and trends are not known. No immediate threats to either have been identified. The species is considered uncommon to fairly common in different parts of its range and occurs in several protected areas. "This genus is an appropriate one for designating indicator species, as the Selenidera toucanets are more strictly forest species than are other toucans."
