= Foam peanut =

Polystyrene packaging material

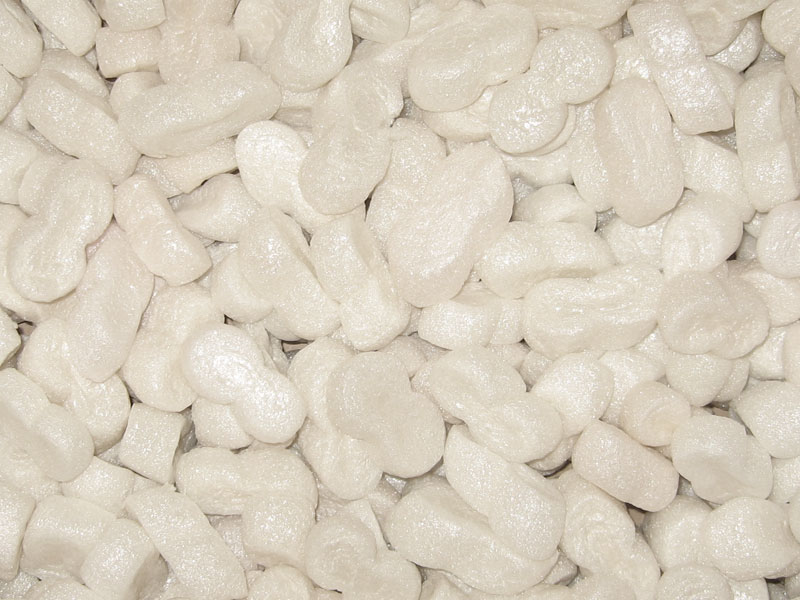
Foam peanuts (made of expanded polystyrene)

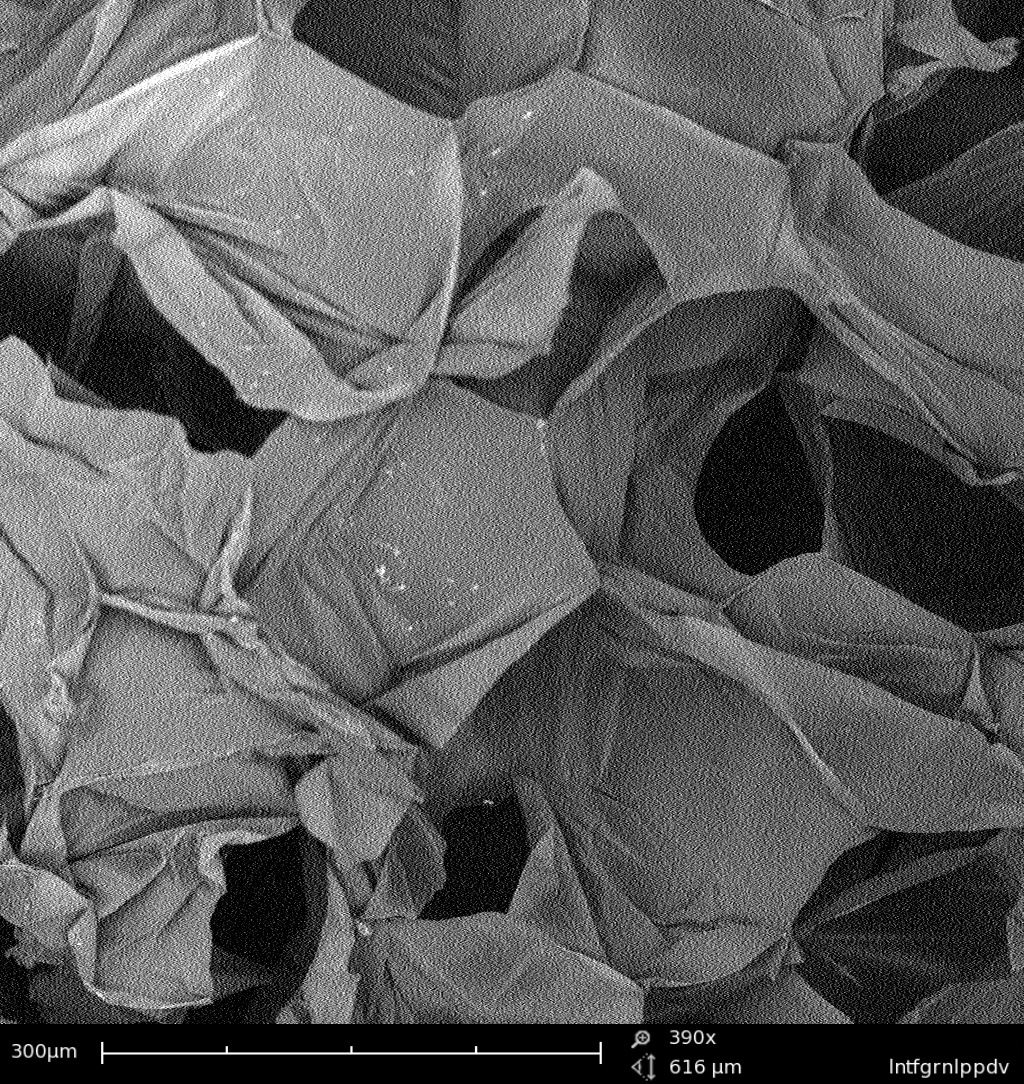
The inner structure of a foam peanut, magnified 390× on a SEM

Foam peanuts, also known as foam popcorn, packing peanuts, or packing noodles, are a common loose-fill packaging and cushioning material used to prevent damage to fragile objects during shipping. They are shaped to interlock when compressed and free flow when not compressed. They are roughly the size and shape of an unshelled peanut and commonly made of expanded polystyrene foam. 50–75 millimetres (2-3 in) of peanuts are typically used for cushioning and void filling packaging applications. The original patent was filed for by Robert E. Holden in 1962 and was granted in 1965.

== Polystyrene foam ==
Polystyrene-based packing peanuts were developed and patented by Tektronix Inc. They were made commercially available circa 1965 by Dow Chemical. Originally made from 100% virgin polystyrene resin, peanuts made from 100% recycled polystyrene have been commercially available since the mid-90s. The color and shape sometimes indicate what it is made of and who made it. Often green is 70% or possibly more recycled polystyrene, white is 70% or more virgin resin and pink means an antistatic agent has been applied; although there are some variations. The most common shapes are similar to a "S", "figure 8" or "W". Foam peanuts are very light (usually around 3 grams per litre/0.17 to 0.2 lb per cu ft) and easy to use.

Polystyrene peanuts may be used and reused many times with little or no loss in protection for the product shipped. They may be reused and recycled at many packing and shipping stores. Because of their build-up, polystyrene peanuts may also be used for various methods of home insulation, although it is not recommended because they are not flame retardant.

== Starch-based ==
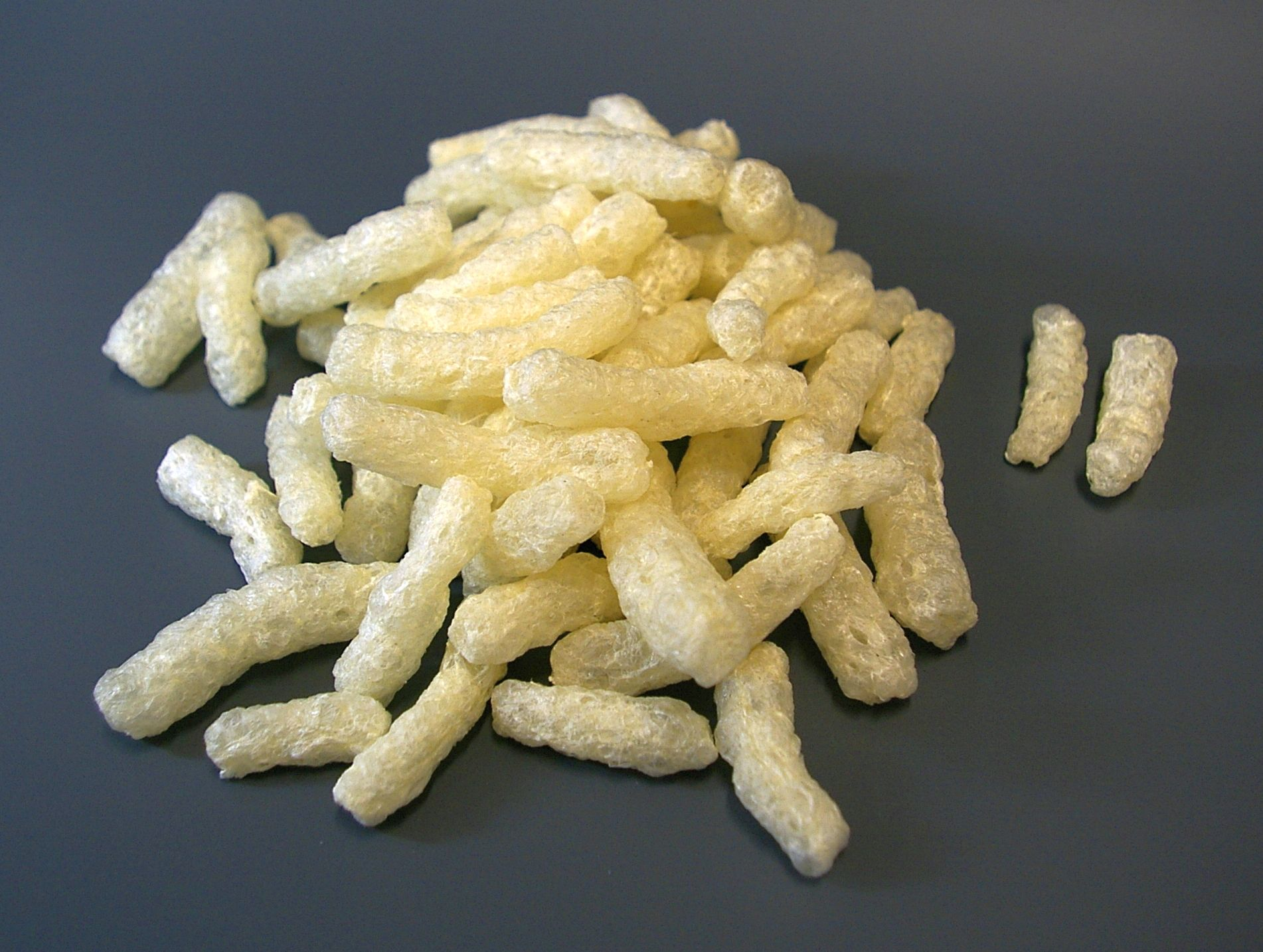
Packaging peanuts made from bioplastics (thermoplastic starch)

In the early 1990s, starch-based packing peanuts were developed as a more environment-friendly alternative. The starch in the peanuts comes from crop-based sources rather than petroleum-based polystyrene, and is non-toxic. One of the first brands of biodegradable peanuts, Biofoam, is made from the grain sorghum; other brands are made from corn starch. Biodegradable foam peanuts have no electrostatic charge, another benefit over polystyrene. Being biodegradable and nontoxic, they are also safe for humans and pets if ingested accidentally. However, they are not produced in food-safe conditions, and are not recommended for eating. Also, during the manufacturing process, the nutritional value is removed from starch-based packing peanuts. This removes edible components, such as sugars, that would otherwise attract rodents and bugs. Their main drawbacks compared with polystyrene are lower resilience, higher weight (6.5 to 13 g per litre/0.4 to 0.8 lb per cubic foot), dust creation, potential attraction of rodents, and higher price. While polystyrene peanuts are soluble in acetone, starch-based peanuts are soluble in water, so starch based products can be disposed down the sink, dissolving on contact with water.

== See also ==
- Cushioning
- Packaging and labeling
