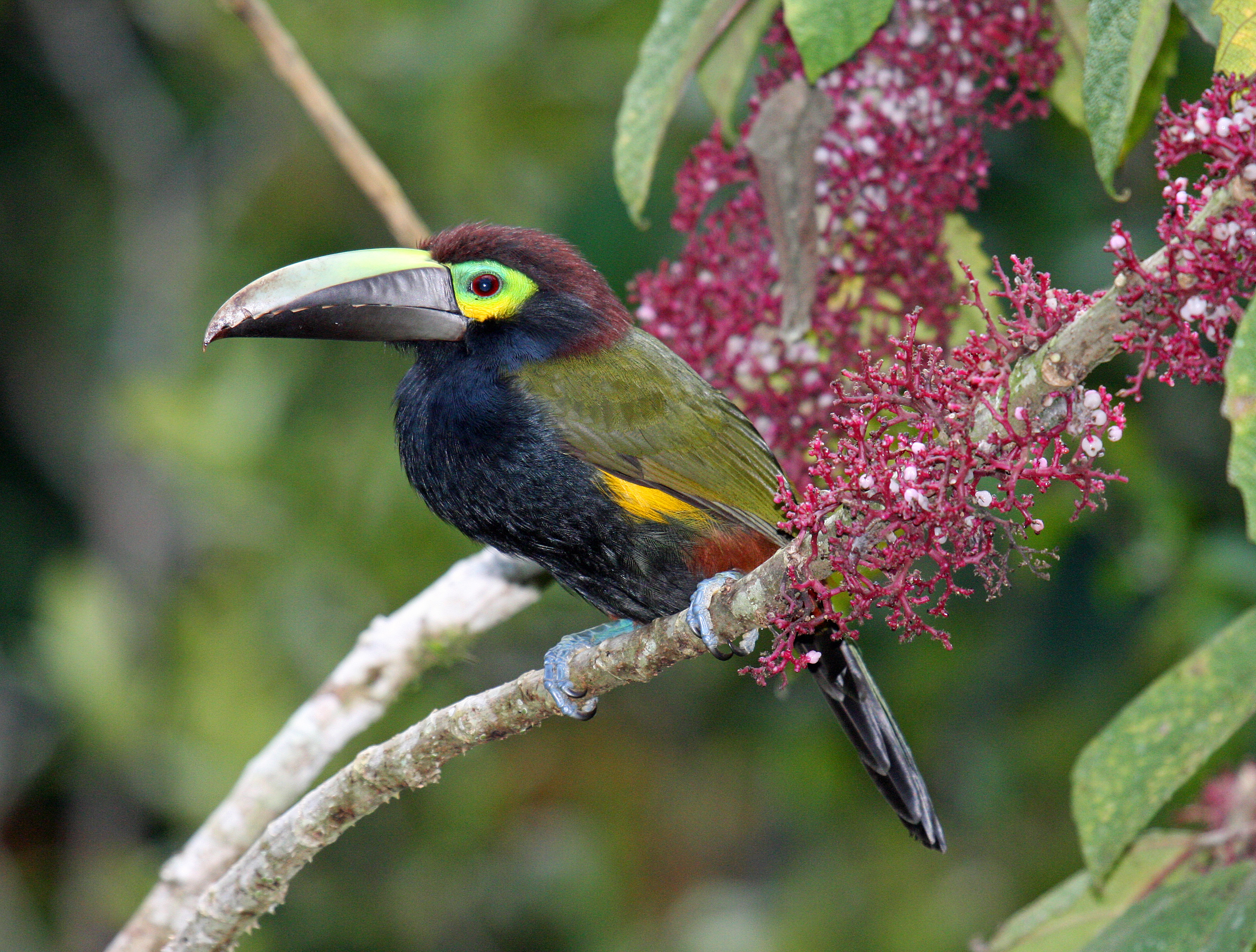
- Female

Conservation status
- Least Concern (IUCN 3.1)

Scientific classification
- Kingdom: Animalia
- Phylum: Chordata
- Class: Aves
- Order: Piciformes
- Family: Ramphastidae
- Genus: Selenidera
- Species: S. spectabilis

Binomial name
- Selenidera spectabilis Cassin, 1858

= Yellow-eared toucanet =

Species of bird

The yellow-eared toucanet (Selenidera spectabilis) is a bird in the toucan family Ramphastidae. It is found from Honduras to Ecuador.

== Taxonomy and systematics ==
Despite its placement in genus Selenidera, the yellow-eared toucanet might be more closely related to the mountain toucans of genus Andigena. It is monotypic.

== Description ==
The yellow-eared toucanet is 36 to 38 cm (14 to 15 in) long and weighs 175 to 245 g (6.2 to 8.6 oz). It is the largest and most distinctively plumaged member of its genus. Males and females have the same bill pattern but the female's bill is shorter. The bill has a vertical black line at its base. The maxilla is yellow with a triangle of olive brown below it narrowing from the base and horn-colored tips on the tomium. The mandible is dark olive to brownish black. Adult males have a black cap that extends down the hindneck, blue to green bare skin around the eye, and a large yellow tuft that extends back behind the eye. Their back and uppertail coverts are green and their tail blackish. They are black from their chin to their belly with a yellow patch on the flank, chestnut thighs, and red undertail coverts. Adult females have a chestnut forehead and hindneck and lack the male's yellow ear tuft. Immatures are duller than adults and the pattern on their bills is less distinct. Males' black is sooty and females' chestnut is brownish.

== Distribution and habitat ==
The yellow-eared toucanet is found from northeastern Honduras south through Nicaragua, Costa Rica, Panama, and western Colombia into extreme northwestern Ecuador. It inhabits wet forested slopes and ridges, nearby secondary forest, and fruit trees close to the forest edge. In elevation it mostly ranges between 300 and 1,100 m (980 and 3,600 ft) but occurs as low as sea level. It also occurs as high as about 1,500 m (4,900 ft) but in Honduras is unknown above 500 m (1,600 ft).

== Behavior ==
=== Movement ===
The yellow-eared toucanet is known to move from higher to lower elevations after the breeding season in Costa Rica and Panama, but whether this is universal or done only by younger birds is not known.

=== Feeding ===
The yellow-eared toucanet usually forages in pairs or small groups, and usually from the forest's mid level to the canopy. It does feed at fruiting bushes near the ground. Its diet has not been detailed but is known to be mostly fruit and also include arthropods and lizards.

=== Breeding ===
The yellow-eared toucanet's breeding season in much of its range is from April to August; it might start somewhat earlier in Honduras and as early as February in Colombia. Courting adults sing while tossing their heads and flipping their tails back and forth. The clutch size is believed to be two to four eggs, but nothing else is known about the species' breeding biology.

=== Vocalization ===
The yellow-eared toucanet's song is "a short to long series normally of double notes, 'tik-ett'" that is sometimes accompanied by bill snapping. Pairs sometimes sing simultaneously. It also makes long and short rattles that may be either vocal or made by the tongue inside the bill.

== Status ==
The IUCN has assessed the yellow-eared toucanet as being of Least Concern. It has a large range and an estimated population of at least 50,000 mature individuals, though the latter is believed to be decreasing. No immediate threats have been identified. It appears to be "uncommon to locally fairly common" in the northern part of its range, rare to uncommon and local in Colombia, and is very rare and local in Ecuador.
