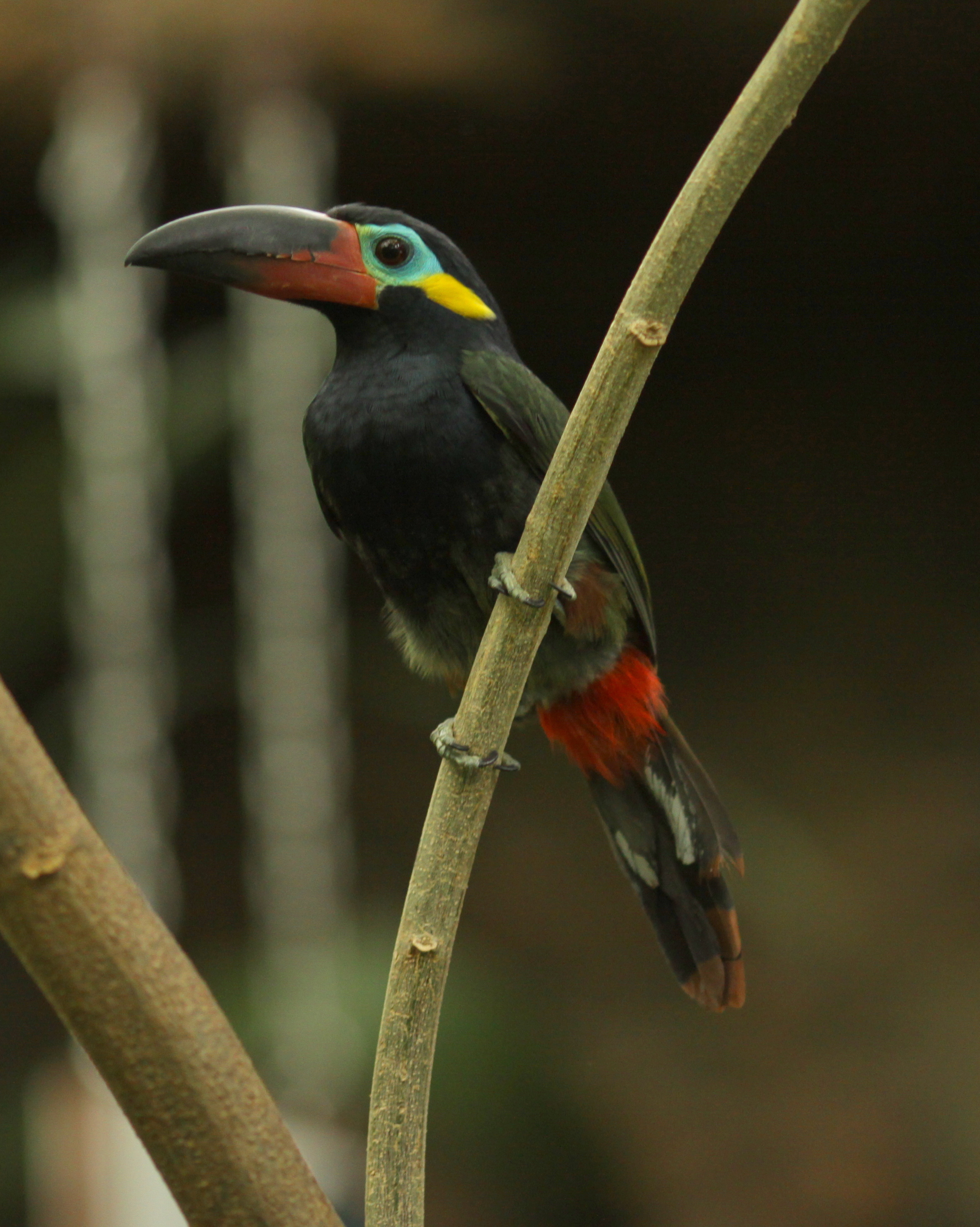
- Male at Dallas World Aquarium, US

Conservation status
- Least Concern (IUCN 3.1)

Scientific classification
- Kingdom: Animalia
- Phylum: Chordata
- Class: Aves
- Order: Piciformes
- Family: Ramphastidae
- Genus: Selenidera
- Species: S. piperivora

Binomial name
- Selenidera piperivora (Linnaeus, 1758)

Synonyms
- Ramphastos piperivorus; Pteroglossus culik; Selenidera culik (Wagler, 1827)

= Guianan toucanet =

Species of bird

The Guianan toucanet, or Guyana toucanet (Selenidera piperivora) is a bird in the toucan family Ramphastidae. It is found in Brazil, French Guiana, Guyana, Suriname, and Venezuela.

== Taxonomy and systematics ==
The Guianan toucanet was originally described as Ramphastos piperivorus It was later named Selenidera culik but following early 21st century scholarship achieved its current (2022) binomial Selenidera piperivora.

The Guianan toucanet is monotypic.

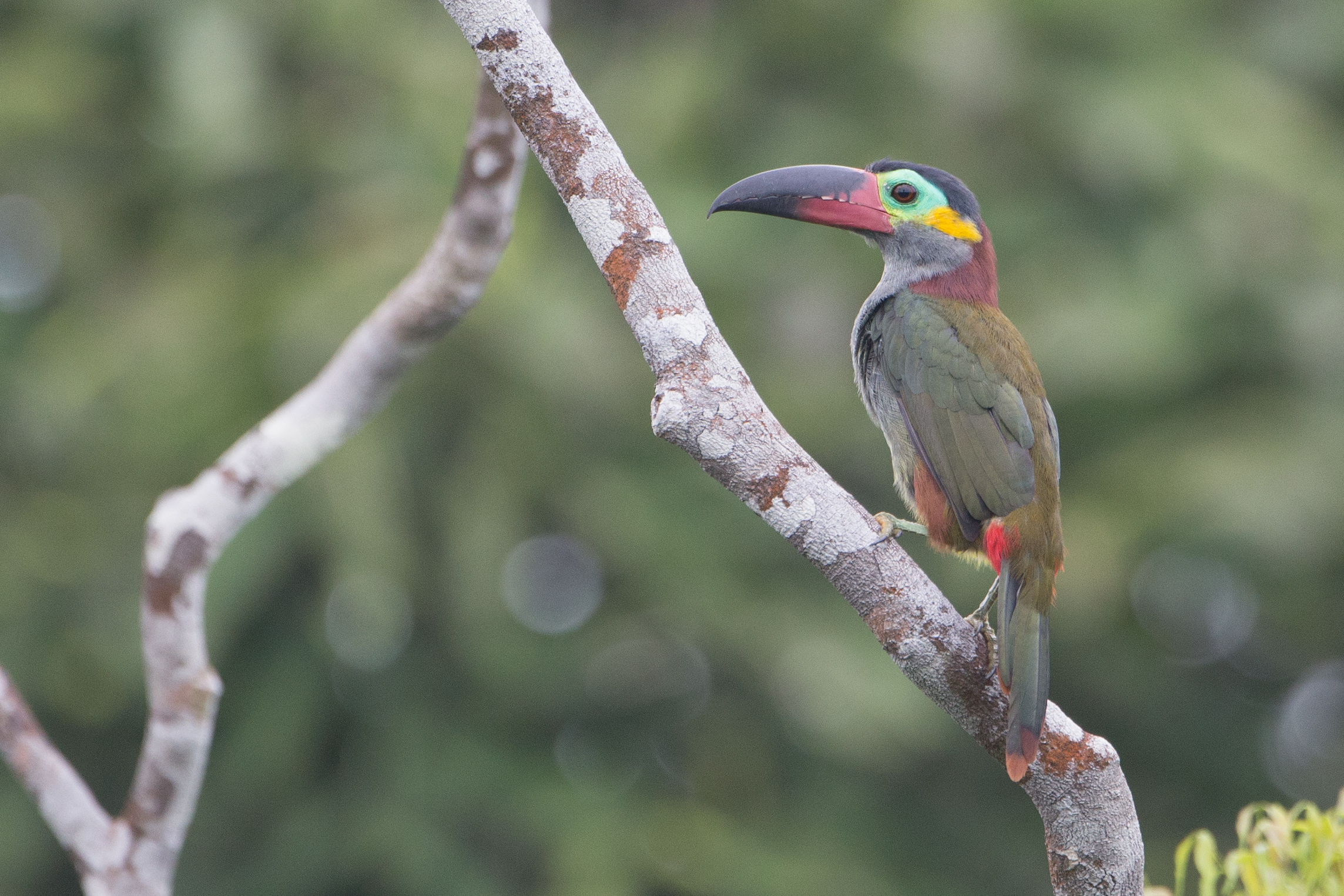
Female in Brazil

== Description ==
The Guianan toucanet is 33 to 35 cm (13 to 14 in) long. Males weigh 129 to 159 g (4.6 to 5.6 oz) and females 132 to 165 g (4.7 to 5.8 oz). Males and females have the same bill pattern but the female's bill is shorter. The bill has a yellowish line at its base. Both the maxilla and mandible are mostly black with red bases; the red extends further on the mandible. Both sexes have bare blue skin around the eye and a tuft of yellow feathers behind the blue. Males are black on the crown, nape, throat, breast and belly. They have a gold "collar" on their upper back; the rest of their upperparts are green. Their tail is green with chestnut tips to the feathers. Their undertail coverts are red. Adult females have a black cap and chestnut nape and upper back with only a hint of yellow collar. Their underparts are gray to green-gray with a green-yellow belly. Immatures are similar to adults but duller overall and with their plumage and bill patterns less distinct.

== Distribution and habitat ==
The Guianan toucanet is found from extreme southeastern Venezuela east through the Guianas into northern Brazil and south to the Amazon River between the Rio Negro and the Amazon's mouth in the state of Amapá. It inhabits moist forest including gallery forest in savannas and favors primary forest over selectively logged areas. In elevation it usually occurs up to 600 m (2,000 ft) but is found as high as 900 m (3,000 ft) in Venezuela and Suriname.

== Behavior ==
=== Movement ===
The Guianan toucanet is believed to be a year-round resident throughout its range.

=== Feeding ===
The Guianan toucanet's diet is mostly fruit, and it also takes insects. There is some evidence of coevolution with the Oenocarpus bacaba palm. It usually forages in pairs or small groups, and usually from the forest's mid level to the sub-canopy.

=== Breeding ===
The Guianan toucanet breeds between March and May in Venezuela and the Guianas and from April to July in Brazil. Males courtship-feed females. It nests in woodpecker holes, sometimes evicting the maker. The clutch size is two or three eggs. The incubation time in captivity is about 16 days but is unknown in the wild; the time to fledging is not known.

=== Vocalization ===
The Guianan toucanet has a wide variety of vocalizations but uses them infrequently. Its song is a "slow series of guttural, frog-like 'arrouk' notes". Its basic call is a "rattle, 'trrrr-trrrr-trrrr...', joined with rising squawk, rooster-like at times, 'kaaaaaaiiiiii'". It also makes "various soft rattles and other calls, some aggressive, others used in courtship feeding and at [the] nest."

== In captivity ==
The Guianan toucanet is sometimes kept in aviculture as a breeder bird or a pet.

== Status ==
The IUCN has assessed the Guianan toucanet as being of Least Concern. It has a large range, and though its population size is not known it is believed to be stable. No immeditate threats have been identified. It is considered common in much of its range.

== Gallery ==
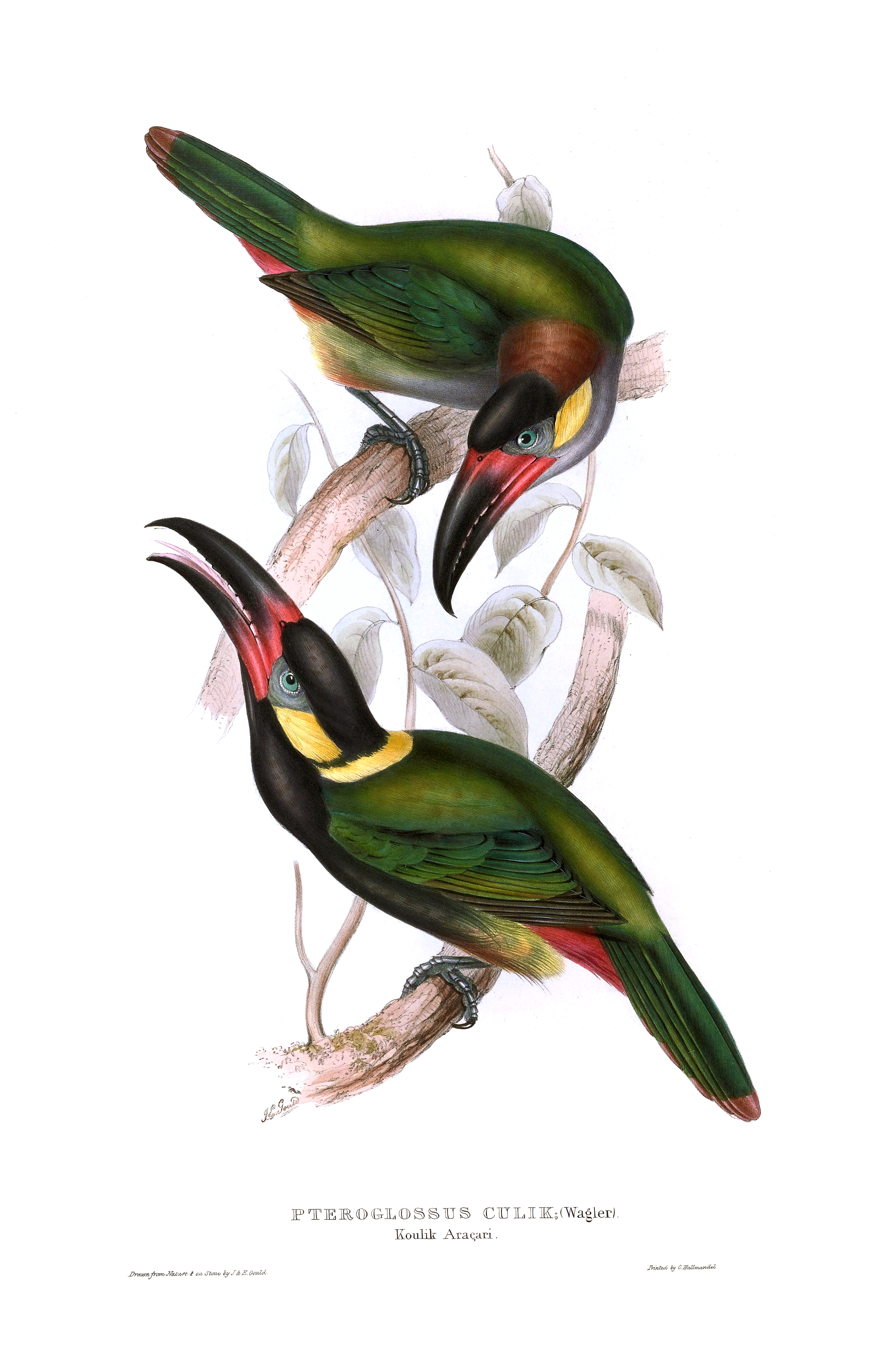
Illustration by John Gould and Elizabeth Gould in 1834. Female above, male below.

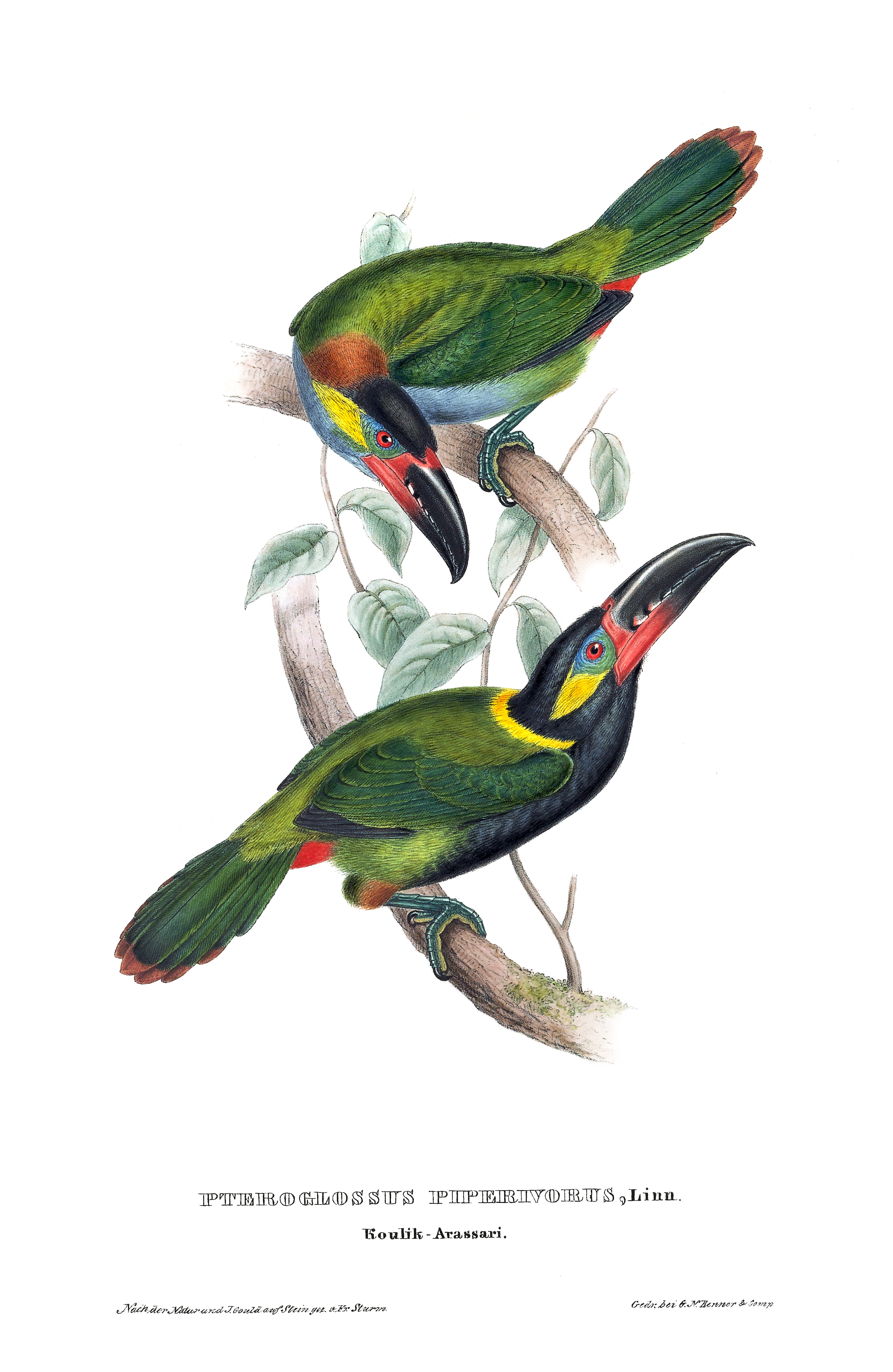
Illustration by Friedrich Sturm in 1847. Modified from the 1834 painting.

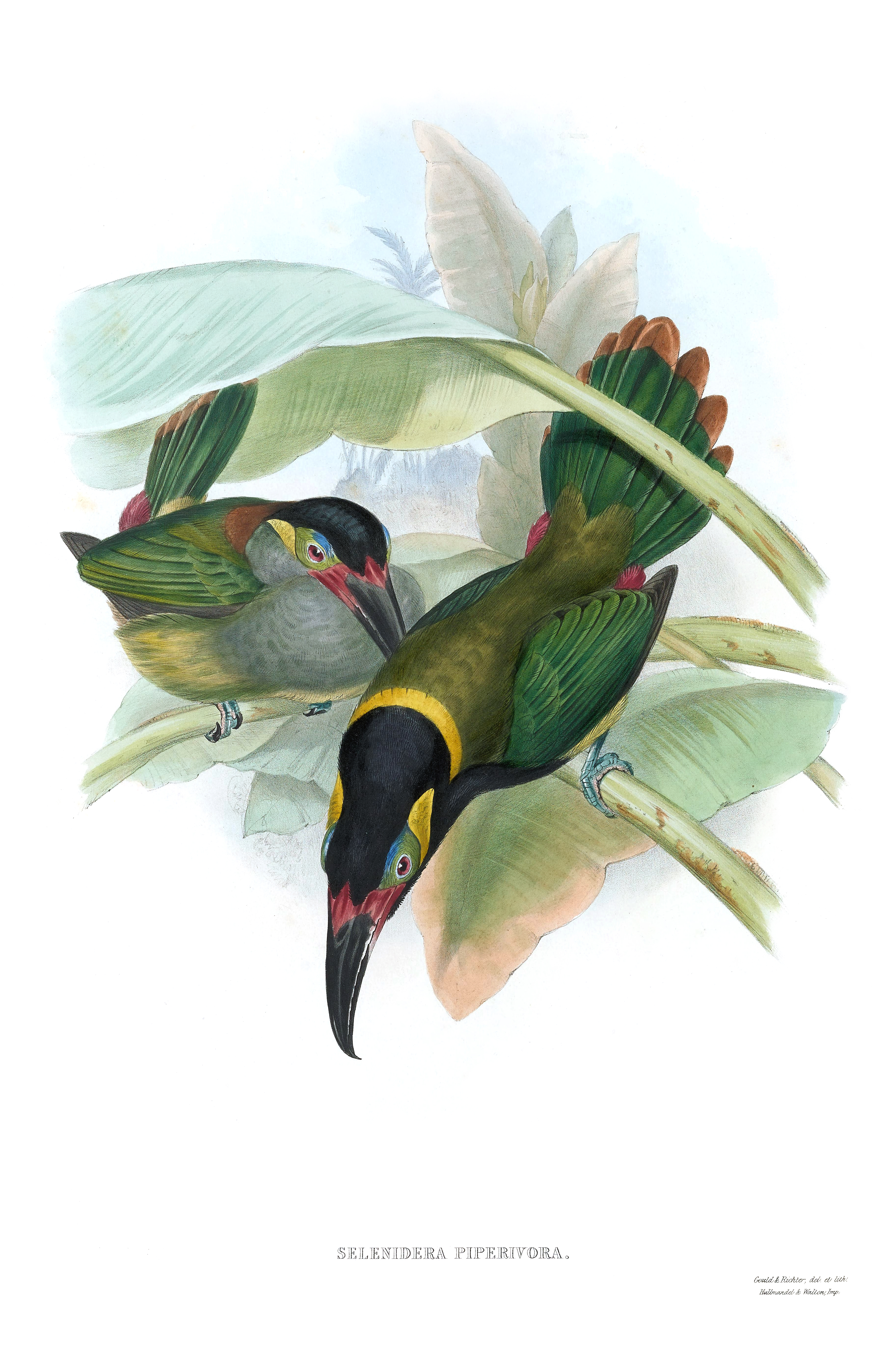
Illustration by John Gould and Henry Constantine Richter in 1854
