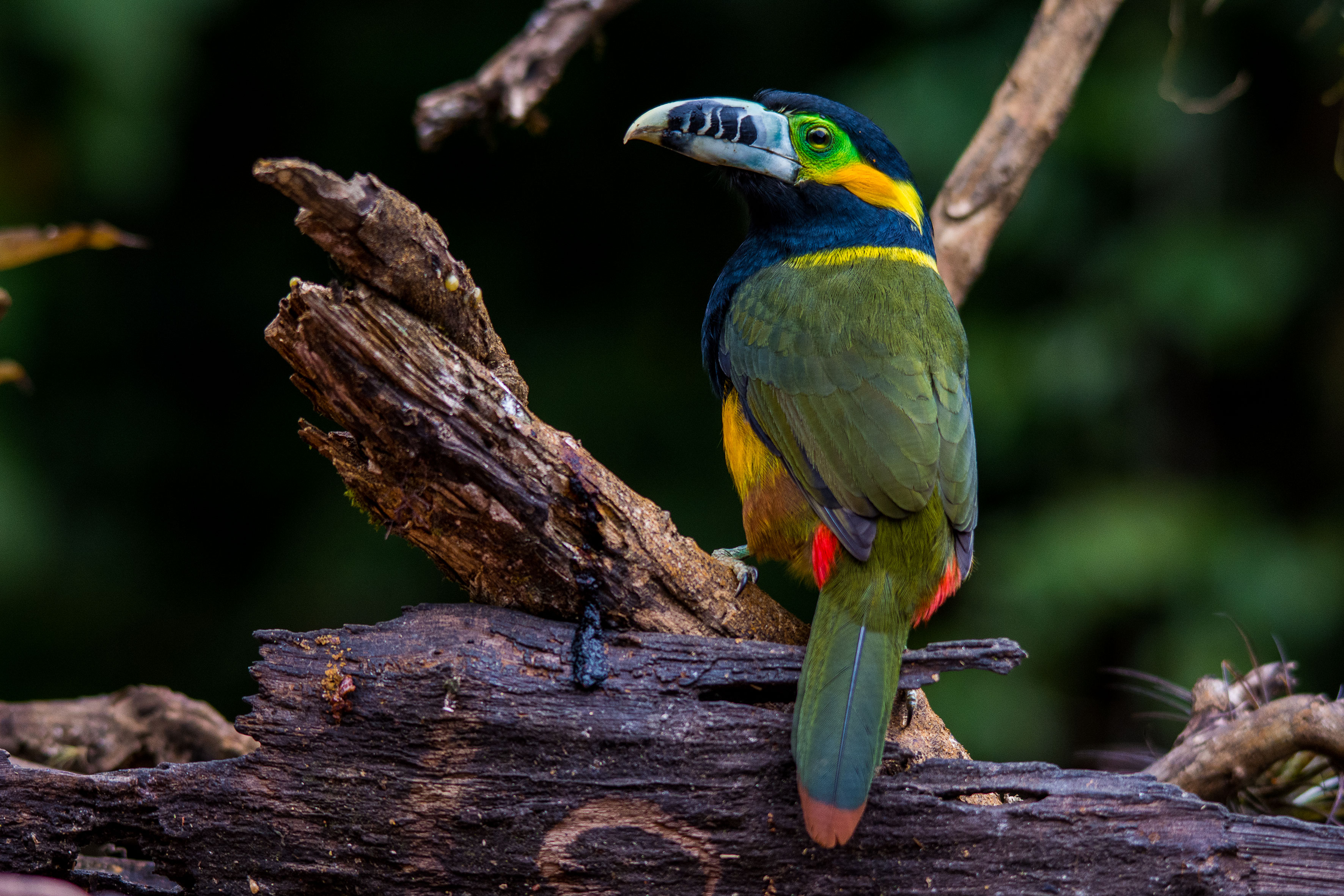
- Male in Brazil
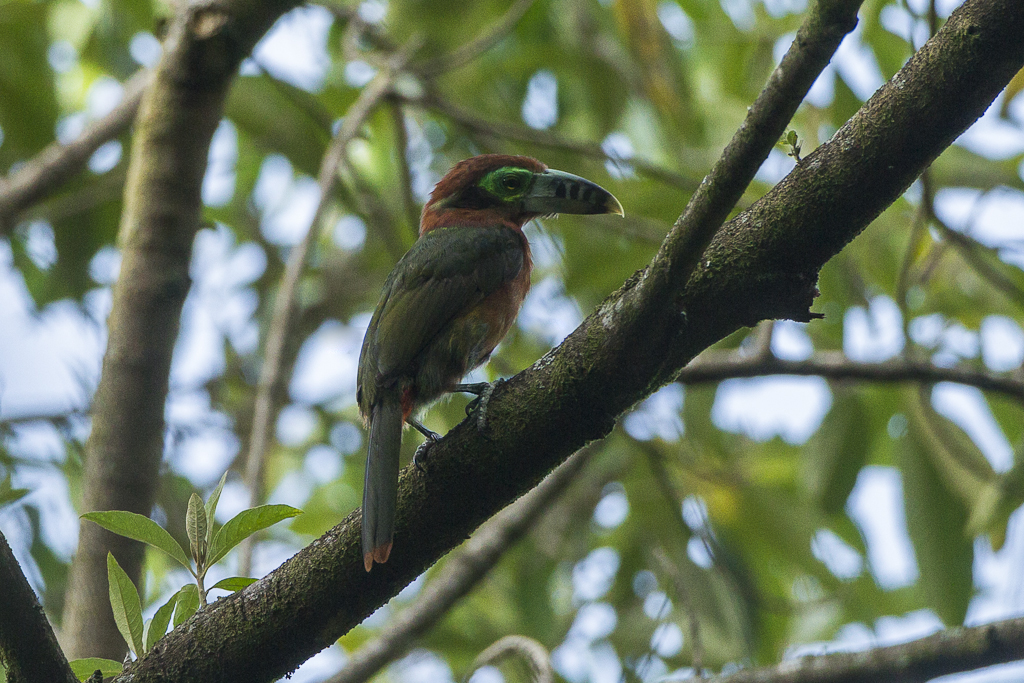
- Female in Brazil

Conservation status
- Least Concern (IUCN 3.1)

Scientific classification
- Kingdom: Animalia
- Phylum: Chordata
- Class: Aves
- Order: Piciformes
- Family: Ramphastidae
- Genus: Selenidera
- Species: S. maculirostris

Binomial name
- Selenidera maculirostris (Lichtenstein, MHC, 1823)

Synonyms
- Pteroglossus maculirostris

= Spot-billed toucanet =

Species of bird

The spot-billed toucanet (Selenidera maculirostris) is a bird in the toucan family Ramphastidae. It is found in Argentina, Brazil, and Paraguay.

== Taxonomy and systematics ==
The spot-billed toucanet was originally described in the genus Pteroglossus. It has at times been considered conspecific with Gould's toucanet (S. gouldii) and the two are sister species. It is monotypic.

== Description ==
The spot-billed toucanet is 33 to 37 cm (13 to 15 in) long and weighs 137 to 193 g (4.8 to 6.8 oz). Males and females have the same bill pattern but the female's bill is shorter. The bill has a thin vertical black line at its base. The bill is mostly ivory at the base to greenish-yellow at the tip. The middle of the culmen is black, the maxilla has three to five vertical black stripes, and the mandible has a black patch near the end. Both sexes have bare green-yellow to blue skin around the eye and a golden-yellow tuft of feathers behind it; both are paler in the female. Adult males have a black head, nape, chin, throat, and belly. Their upperparts are green with a yellow band on the lower neck. Their tail is green with chestnut tips on the central three pairs of feathers. Their flanks are yellow and their undertail coverts are red. Females have chestnut to cinnamon-rufous where the male has black. Immatures are duller overall, usually without a yellow band on the back, and their bill's pattern is not sharp.

== Distribution and habitat ==
The spot-billed toucanet is found in Brazil from the states of Bahia and Minas Gerais south and into eastern Paraguay and Argentina's Misiones Province. It is a bird of the Atlantic Forest where it is found in old-growth and secondary forest, selectively logged and remnant forest, palm groves, and gallery forest at the edges of the cerrado. In elevation it ranges from sea level to at least 1,000 m (3,280 ft).

== Behavior ==
=== Movement ===
As far as is known, the spot-billed toucanet is a year-round resident throughout its range.

=== Feeding ===
The spot-billed toucanet forages from the undergrowth up to the forest's mid-storey, singly, in pairs, or in small groups. Its diet is known to include fruit (such as Euterpe and Cecropia, as many cultivated fruits in captivity) and some vertebrates (in the form of dead young mice to nestlings in captivity) but details are lacking.

=== Breeding ===
The spot-billed toucanet's breeding season is from December to June in the northern part of its range and from October to January in the southern part. In the wild it nests in tree cavities, and both sexes provision young birds, but almost nothing else is known about its natural breeding biology. In captivity the clutch size is two or three, the incubation period is about 15 days, and time to fledging is about six to seven weeks.

=== Vocal and non-vocal sounds ===
The spot-billed toucanet makes "[g]ruff, growling 'ggrooaw' to 'kkrowk' notes in series". The sexes usually sing one at a time. It also makes "low 'tut' notes, rattling notes, purring low notes, [and] bill-snapping sounds."

== Status ==
The IUCN has assessed the spot-billed toucanet as being of Least Concern. It has a large range but its population size is not known and is believed to be decreasing. No immediate threats have been identified. It is common in some protected areas but locally threatened elsewhere. "Information [is] needed on breeding biology of wild birds."
