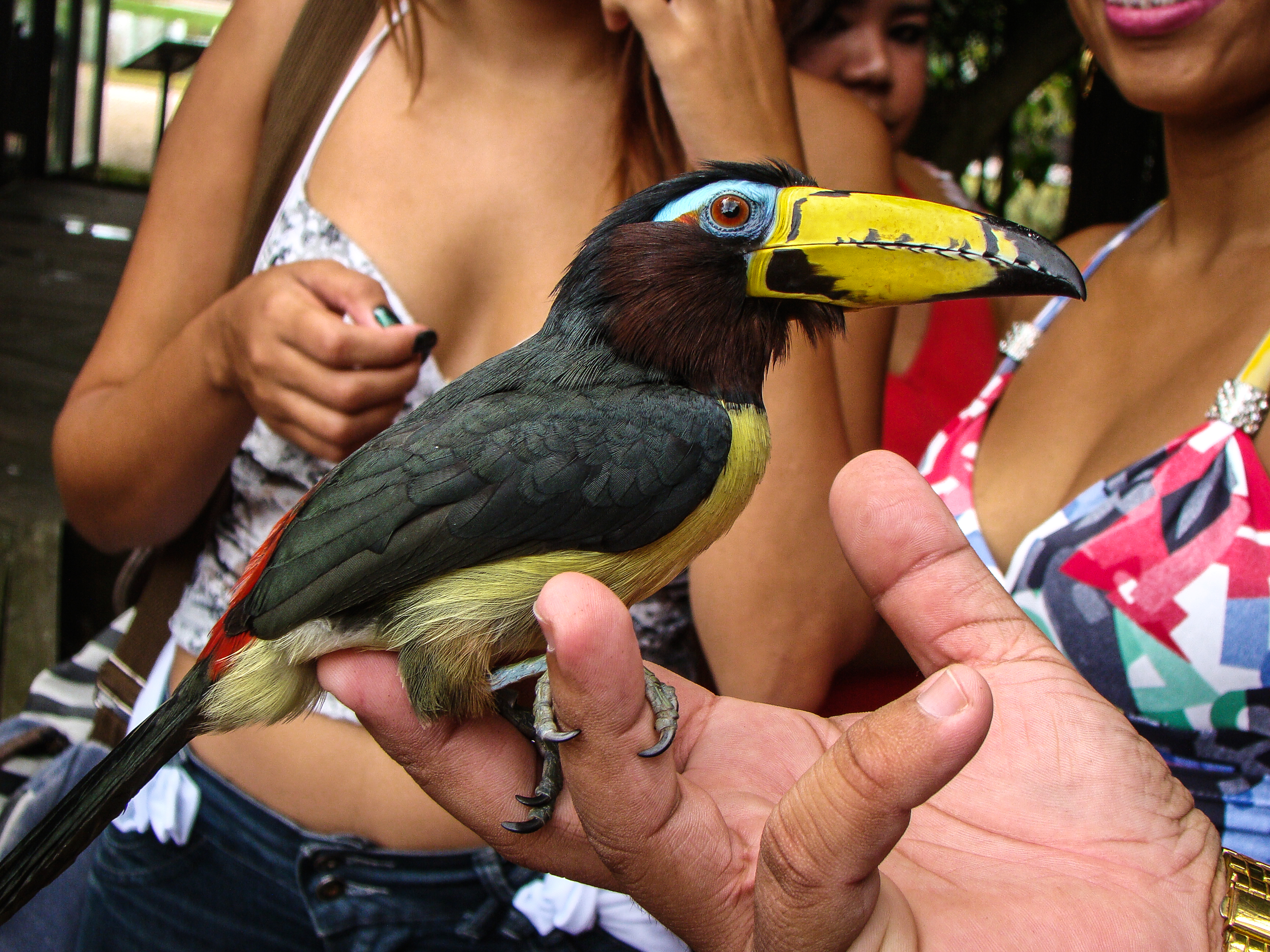

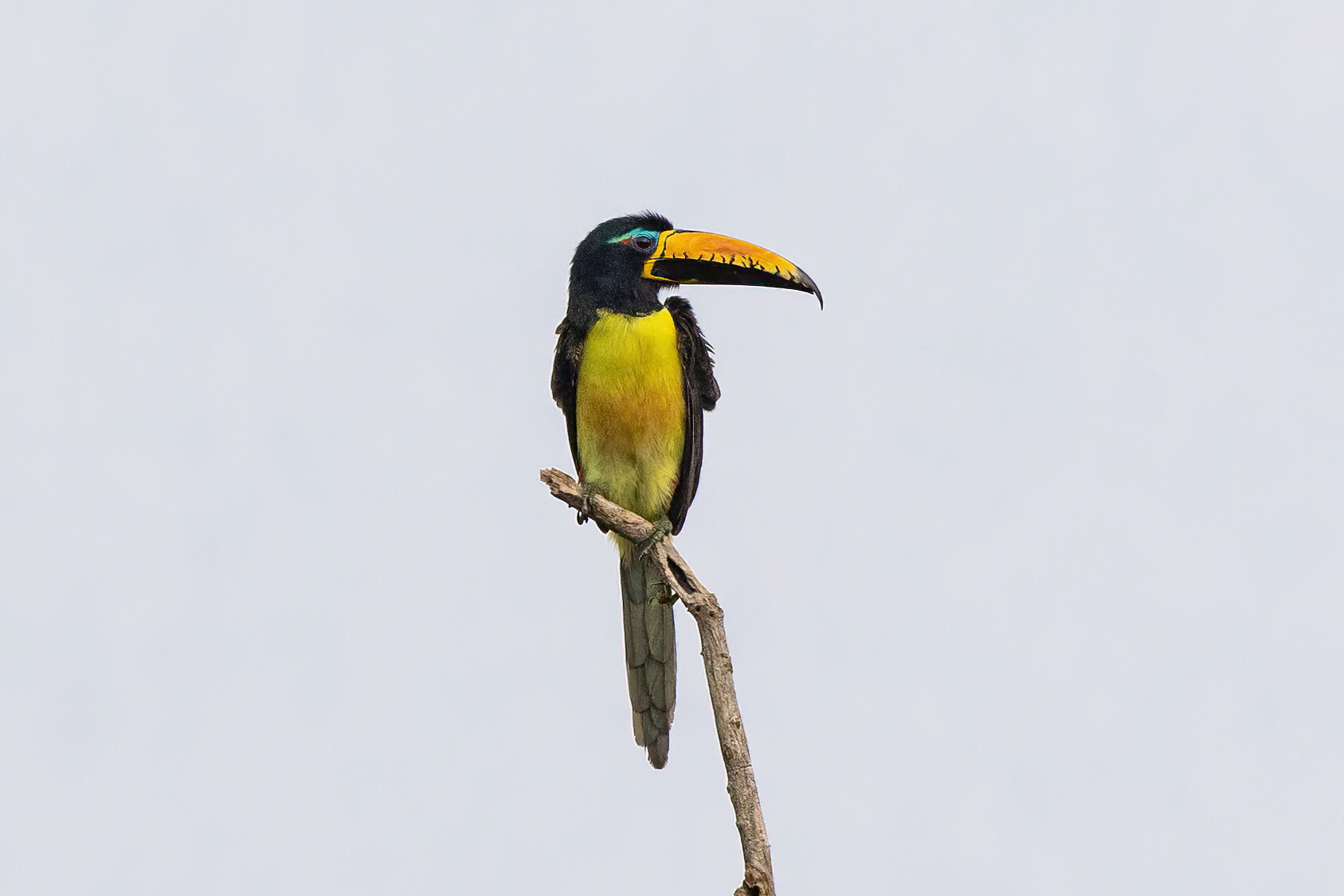
- Subspecies P. i. insciptus (above), P. i. humboldti (below)

Conservation status
- Least Concern (IUCN 3.1)

- Least Concern (IUCN 3.1)

Scientific classification
- Kingdom: Animalia
- Phylum: Chordata
- Class: Aves
- Order: Piciformes
- Family: Ramphastidae
- Genus: Pteroglossus
- Species: P. inscriptus

Binomial name
- Pteroglossus inscriptus Swainson, 1822

Subspecies
- See text

Synonyms
- Pteroglossus didymus (in part) Sclater, 1890; Pteroglossus humboldti (in part) Wagler, 1827; Pteroglossus viridis humboldti (in part) Wagler, 1827

= Lettered aracari =

Species of bird

The lettered aracari or lettered araçari (Pteroglossus inscriptus) is a bird in the toucan family Ramphastidae. It is found in Bolivia, Brazil, Colombia, Ecuador, and Peru.

== Taxonomy and systematics ==
The International Ornithological Committee (IOC), the Clements taxonomy, and the South American Classification Committee of the American Ornithological Society (SACC) recognize two subspecies of lettered aracari: the nominate P. i. inscriptus (Swainson, 1822) and P. i. humboldti (Wagler, 1827). P. i. humboldti had originally been described as a separate species, and later as a subspecies of green aracari (P. viridis). BirdLife International's Handbook of the Birds of the World treats it as a species, "Humboldt's araçari". The SACC is soliciting a proposal to adopt that treatment.

This article follows the IOC et al. two-subspecies model.

== Description ==
The lettered aracari is 33 to 35.5 cm (13 to 14 in) long. The nominate subspecies weighs about 100 to 130 g (3.5 to 4.6 oz) and P. i. humboldti about 110 to 185 g (3.9 to 6.5 oz). In both the male is larger than the female and has a longer bill. Their bills have a complex pattern. The nominate's has a mostly yellow maxilla with a narrow black stripe on the culmen, a wide black tip, and a series of black "script" markings along its lower edge. Its mandible is pale yellow with a wide black base and tip and a few black "script" markings near the tip. P. i. humboldti's maxilla is like the nominate's but its mandible is almost entirely black.

Nominate males have a black head except for bare blue, violet gray, and red skin around the eye. Their upperparts, wings, and tail are dark green except for a crimson rump. Their breast, belly, and undertail coverts are yellow with pale buff cinnamon blotches. Their tibial feathers vary from green to half green and half pale yellow. Nominate females have chestnut on their throat and the sides of their head and neck; the throat's chestnut has a narrow black band below it. Immatures resemble pale versions of the adults.

Both sexes of subspecies P. i. humboldti have plumage very like the nominates' except for cinnamon or rufous tibial feathers.

== Distribution and habitat ==
The nominate subspecies of lettered aracari is found in north central Brazil south of the Amazon River between the Madeira and Maranhão rivers and from there south to northern Bolivia and the Brazilian state of Mato Grosso and the upper Tocantins River. A small separate population is in the far eastern Brazilian states of Pernambuco and Alagoas. P. i. humboldti is found in southern Colombia, eastern Ecuador, northwestern Bolivia, and western Brazil near the Amazon to the Negro River and south a bit beyond the upper Madeira River. (Note that the map shows the distribution of only the nominate.)

The species inhabits a variety of lowland evergreen forest types in the upper Amazon basin. These include várzea, terra firme, secondary and gallery forests, and forested islands. In elevation it generally ranges as high as about 500 m (1,600 ft) but locally occurs as high as 900 m (3,000 ft).

== Behavior ==
=== Feeding ===
The lettered aracari forages mostly in the canopy but will descend to near the ground when following army ants. Small groups, which might be extended families, often forage together. Its diet is mostly fruit but it apparently also takes small arthropods. It also predates other species' nests for eggs and young.

=== Breeding ===
The lettered aracari's nesting season appears to span from December to July in the western part of its range and from August to March in eastern Brazil. It is assumed to nest in tree cavities like other toucans. Nothing else is known about its breeding biology.

=== Vocal and non-vocal sounds ===
The lettered aracari is not considered particularly vocal. Its song has variously been described as "an often long-continued series of guttural cha notes", as "a fast series of sharp kkik (or kkuk, or kkek) notes", and as "a series of electric grunts: jrnk jrnk jrnk...". It also gives "single chak or kak notes." A non-vocal sound is a bill rattle "bdddt" that is thought to be used in agonistic encounters.

== Status ==
The IUCN follows HBW taxonomy and so has assessed the two subspecies of lettered aracari as separate species. Both are assessed as being of Least Concern. Both have large ranges and populations of unknown size that are believed to be decreasing. No immediate threats to either have been identified. The species is considered rare to fairly common in different parts of its range. It is "reliant on forested habitats, and so, although it tolerates advanced second growth, it is vulnerable in the long term to Amazonian deforestation."
