= Biofoam =

Foam made from biological substances

Biofoams are biological or biologically derived foams, making up lightweight and porous cellular solids. A relatively new term, its use in academia began in the 1980s in relation to the scum that formed on activated sludge plants.

Biofoams is a broad umbrella term that covers a large variety of topics including naturally occurring foams, as well as foams produced from biological materials such as soy oil and cellulose. Biofoams have been a topic of continuous research because synthesized biofoams are being considered as alternatives to traditional petroleum-based foams. Due to the variable nature of synthesized foams, they can have a variety of characteristics and material properties that make them suitable for packaging, insulation, and other applications.

== Naturally occurring foams ==
Foams can form naturally within a variety of living organisms. For example, wood, cork, and plant matter all can have foam components or structures. Fungi are generally composed of mycelium, which is made up of hollow filaments of chitin nanofibers bound to other components. Animal parts like cancellous bone, horseshoe crab shells, toucan beaks, sponge, coral, feathers, and antlers all contain foam-like structures which decrease overall weight at the expense of other material properties.

Structures like bone, antlers, and shells have strong materials housing weaker but lighter materials within. Bones tend to have compact, dense external regions, which protect the internal foam-like cancelous bone. The same principle applies to horseshoe crab shells, toucan beaks, and antlers. The barbs and shafts of feathers similarly contain closed-cell foam.

Protective foams can be formed externally by parent organisms or by eggs interacting with the environment: tunicate egg mix with sea water to create a liquid-based foam; tree frog eggs grow in protein foams above and on water (see Figure 1); certain freshwater fish lay eggs in surface foam from their mucus; deep sea fish produce eggs in swimbladders of dual layered foams; and some insects keep their larvae in foam.

== Biomimetic synthetic foams ==
=== Honeycomb ===
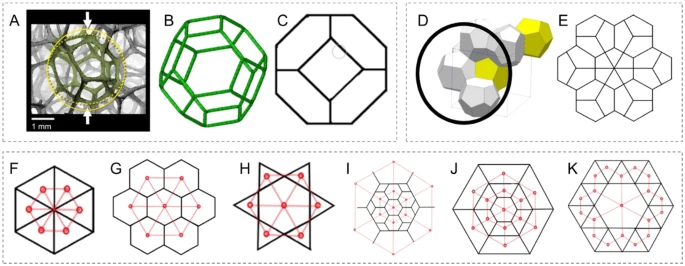
Figure 2: Depiction of various honeycomb patterns

Honeycomb refers to bioinspired patterns that provide a lightweight design for energy absorbing structures. Honeycomb design can be found in different structural biological components such as spongy bone and plant vasculature. Biologically inspired honeycomb structures include Kelvin, Weaire and Floret honeycomb (see Figure 2); each with a slightly different structure in comparison to the natural hexagonal honeycomb. These variations on the biological design have yielded significantly improved energy absorption results in comparison to traditional hexagonal honeycomb biofoam.

Due to these increased energy absorption performances, honeycomb inspired structures are being researched for use inside vehicle crumple zones. By using honeycomb structures as the inner core and surrounding the structure with a more rigid structural shell, these components can absorb impact energy during a crash and reduce the amount of energy the driver experiences.

=== Aerogel ===
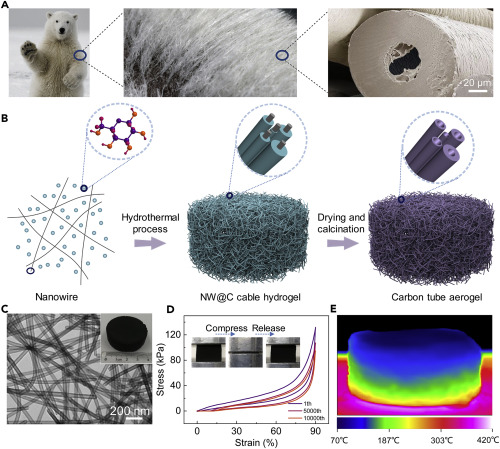
Figure 3: Bioinspired Macroscopic Carbon Tube Aerogel (CTA) compared with polar bear fur at high magnification

Aerogels are able to fill large volumes with minimal material yielding special properties such as low density and low thermal conductivity. These aerogels tend to have internal structures categorized as open or closed cell structures, the same cell structure that is used to define many 3-dimensional honeycomb biofoams. Aerogels are also being engineered to mirror the internal foam structures of animal hairs (see Figure 3). These biomimetic aerogels are being actively researched for their promising elastic and insulative properties.

== Material properties ==
=== Foam cell structures ===
A foam is considered open-celled if at least two of its facets are holes rather than walls. In this case the entirety of the load on the foam is on the cross-beams that make up the edges of the cell. If no more than one of the walls of the cell are holes, the foam is considered closed-celled in nature. For most synthetic foams, a mixture of closed cell and open cell character is observed due to cells rupturing during the foaming process and then the matrix solidifying.

The mechanical properties of the foam then depend on the closed cell character of the foam as derived by Gibson and Ashby:

$\left ( \frac{E}{E_s} \right )\propto\left ( \frac{ \rho}{ \rho_s} \right )^2\left ( \frac{1}{(1+ \phi)^2} \right )\left [ 1 + \frac{ \rho}{ \rho_s} ( \frac{ \phi ^3}{1 + \phi} ) \right]$

Where E is the elastic modulus, ρ is the density of the material, φ is the ratio of the volume of the face to the volume of the edge of the material, and the subscript s denotes the bulk property of the material rather than that of the foam sample.

=== Liquid and solid foams ===
For many polymeric foams, a solidified foam is formed by polymerizing and foaming a liquid polymer mixture and then allowing that foam to solidify. Thus, liquid foam aging effects do occur before solidification. In the liquid foam, gravitational forces and internal pressures cause a flow of the liquid toward the bottom of the foam. This causes some of the foam cells to form into irregular polyhedra as liquid drains, which are less stable structures than the spherical structures of a traditional foam. These structures can however be stabilized by the presence of a surfactant.

The foam structure before solidification is an inherently unstable one, as the voids present greatly increase the surface free energy of the structure. In some synthetic biofoams, a surfactant can be used in order to lower the surface free energy of the foam and therefore stabilize the foam. In some natural biofoams, proteins can act as the surfactants for the foams to form and stabilize.

=== Fiber reinforcement ===
During the solidification of synthetic biofoams, fibers may be added as a reinforcement agent for the matrix. This additionally will create a heterogeneous nucleation site for the air pockets of the foam itself during the foaming process. However, as fiber content increases, it can begin to inhibit formation of the cellular structure of the matrix.

== Applications ==
=== Packaging ===
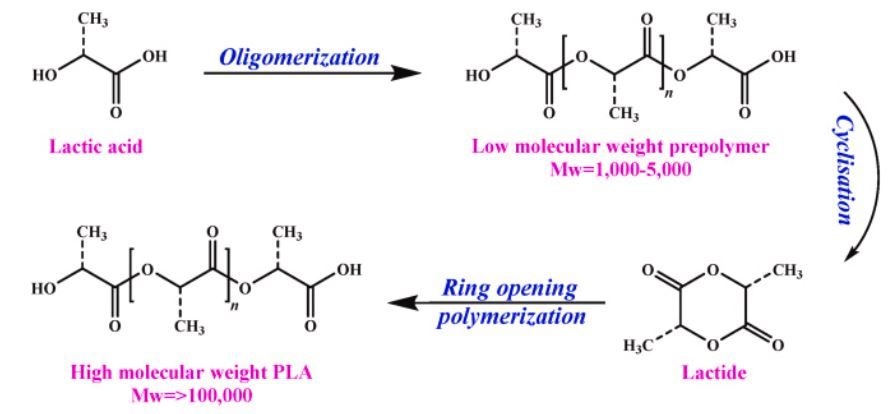
Figure 4. PLA being produced through ring-opening polymerization of lactide.

In relation to packaging, starches and biopolyesters make up these biofoams as they are adequate replacements to expanded polystyrene. Polylactic acids (PLAs) are a common form of the basis of these biofoams since they offer a substitute for polyolefin-based foams that are commonly used in automotive parts, pharmaceutical products, and short life-time disposable packaging industries due to their bio-based and biodegradable properties. PLA comes from the formation of lactide produced from lactic acid due to bacterial fermentation through ring-opening polymerization, in which the process is shown through Figure 4.

PLA does not have the most desirable traits for biodegradability in the packaging industry as it contains a low heat distortion temperature and has unfavorable water barrier characteristics. On the other hand, PLA has been shown to have desirable packaging properties including high ultraviolet light barrier properties, and low melting and glass transition temperatures. As of recently, PGA has been introduced in the packaging industry as it is a good solvent and comparable to PLA. Table 1 shows the characteristics of both biofoams and how they compare. As shown, PGA contains a strong stereochemistry structure which in turn causes it to have high barrier and mechanical properties making it desirable for the packaging industry. The study of mixing both PGA and PLA has been explored by using copolymerization in order for PGA to help enhance the barrier properties of PLA when used in packaging.

	Tg (°C)	Tm (°C)	Tensile strength (MPa)	Young's modulus (GPa)	Elongation at break (%)	Flexural strength (MPa)	Flexural modulus (GPa)
PLA	57-58	140-180	53	2.4	5	92	3.4
PGA	35-40	220-230	115	7	16.4	222	7.8

Table 1: The properties of PLA in comparison to PGA.

=== Biomedical ===
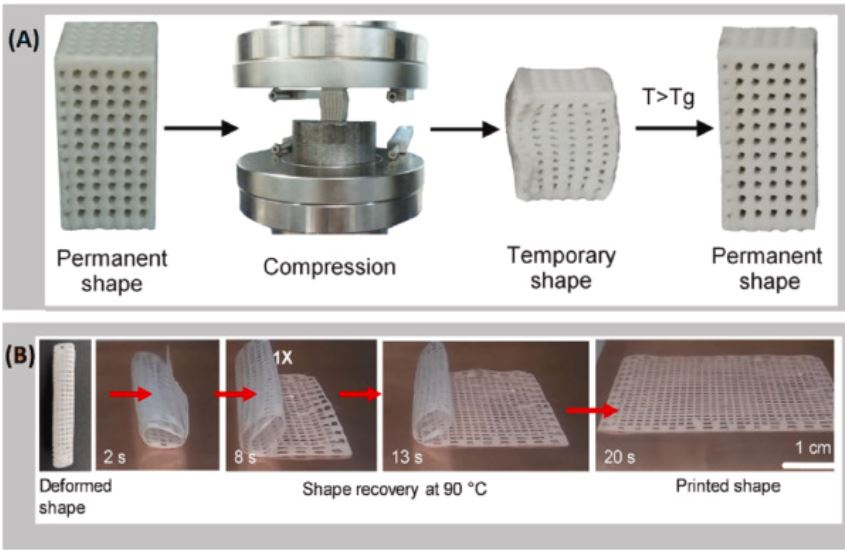
Figure 5: The FFF-based 3D printed PLA undergoing compression testing and its shape after heating the sample greater than its glass transition temperature (Tg).

The most popular biofoam in the use of biomedical devices is PLA as well. PLA's properties are also desirable in biomedical applications, especially in combination with other polymers. Specifically, its biocompatibility and biodegradability make it favorable in tissue engineering through the use of FDM-3D printing. PLA does well in these printing environments as its glass transition temperature as well as shape memory is small. In recent studies, PLA has been specifically combined with hydroxyapatite (HA) in order to make the modulus of the sample more favorable for its application in repairing bone failure. Specifically in tissue engineering, HA has also been shown to generate osteogenesis by triggering osteoblasts and pre-osteoblastic cells. HA is a strong material, which makes it ideal to add to PLA, due to the fact that PLA has weak toughness with a 10% elongation before failure. FFF-based 3D printing was used as well as compression tests demonstrated in Figure 5. The results showed that there was a self-healing capability of the sample, which could be used in certain biomedical practices.

== Environmental impact ==
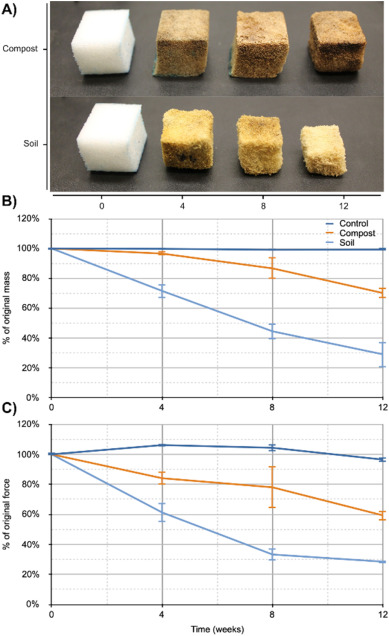
Figure 7: Biodegradation of PU cubes over 12 weeks. Degradation was analyzed through A) change in appearance, B) cube mass, and C) maximum force at 50% compression force deflection (CFD). Error bars indicate sample standard deviations of the triplicate measurements. For compost and soil mass loss, p < 0.01, and for compost and soil CFD, p < 0.01 (Table S2).

With recent attention toward climate change, global warming, and sustainability, there has been a new wave of research regarding the creation and sustainability of biodegradable products. This research has evolved to include the creation of biodegradable biofoams, with the intention to replace other foams that may be environmentally harmful or whose production may be unsustainable. Following this vein, Gunawan et al. conducted research to developed “commercially-relevant polyurethane products that can biodegrade in the natural environment”. One such product includes flip-flops so as part of the research a flip-flop made from algae derived polyurethane was prototyped (see Figure 7). This research ultimately resulted in the conclusion that in both a compost and soil environment (different microorganisms present in each environment) significant degradation occurs in polyurethane foam formulated from algae oil.

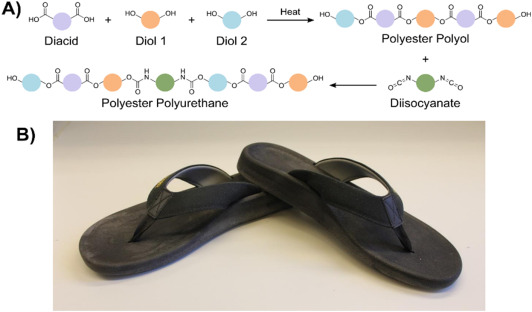
Figure 6: A) General polyester polyol and polyurethane (PU) syntheses and structure. B) Algenesis algae-based PU flip-flop prototype

Similarly, research has been done where algae oil (AO) and residual palm oil (RPO) have been formulated into foam polyurethane at different ratios to determine what ratio has the optimum biodegradability. RPO is recovered from the waste of palm oil mill and is a byproduct of that manufacturing process. After undergoing a tests to determine biodegradability as well as a thermogravimetric analysis, the team determined that the material could be utilized in applications such as insulation or fire retardants depending on the AO/RPO ratio.

Another focus of biofoam research is the development of biofoams that are not only biodegradable, but are also cost-effective and require less energy to produce. Luo et al. have conducted research in this area of biofoams and have ultimately developed a biofoam that is produced from a “higher content of nature bioresource materials” and using a “minimal [number of] processing steps”. The processing steps include the one-pot method of foam preparation published by F. Zhang and X. Luo in their paper about developing polyurethane biofoams as an alternative to petroleum based foams for specific applications.

== Ongoing research ==
Research efforts have been put into using natural components in the creation of potentially biodegradable foam products. Mycelium (Figure 8), chitosan (Figure 9), wheat gluten (Figure 10), and cellulose (Figure 11) have all been used to create biofoams for different purposes. The wheat gluten example was used in combination with graphene to attempt to make a conductive biofoam. The mycelium-based, chitosan-based, and cellulose-based biofoam examples are intended to become cost effective and low density material options.

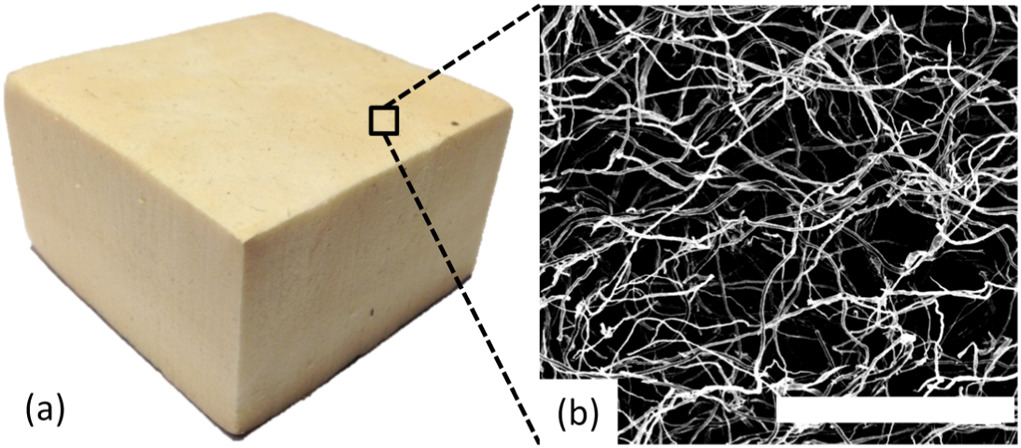
Figure 8: a) shows a block of mycelium biofoam and b) shows a scanning electron microscope image of it.

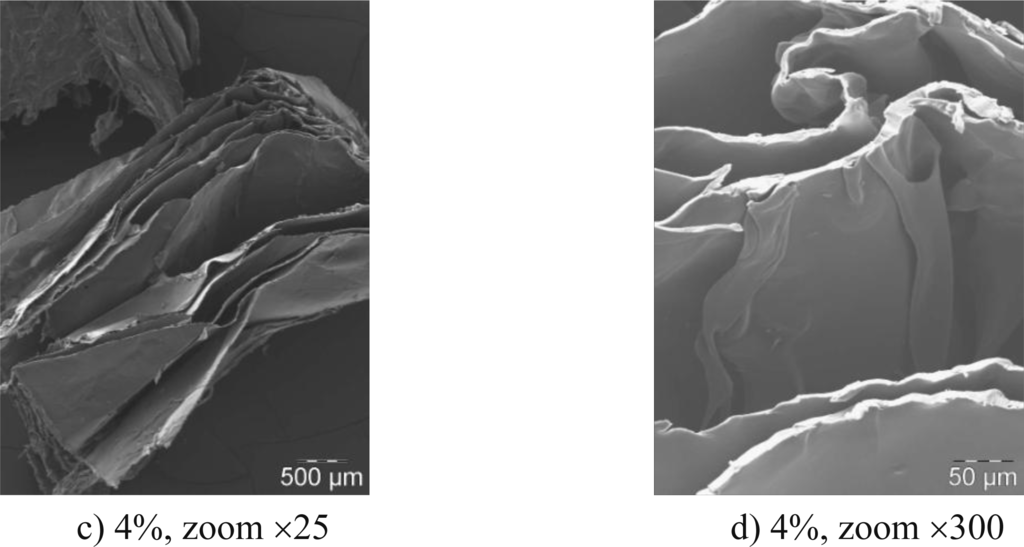
Figure 9: These open access scanning electron microscopy images show a chitosan based biofoam at two different magnifications.

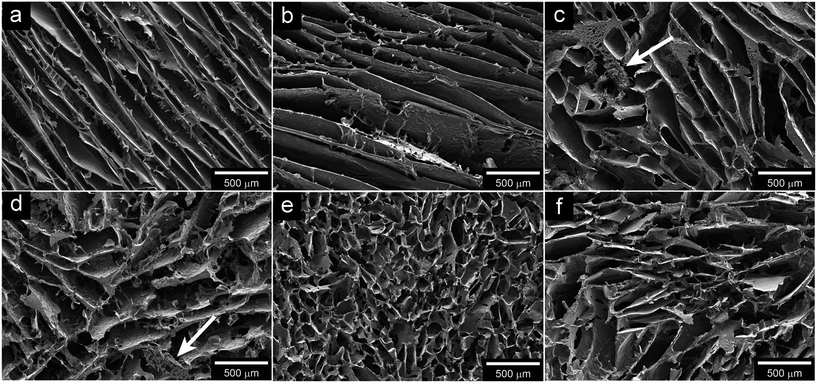
Figure 10: Open access scanning electron microscopy images of wheat-gluten based foam.

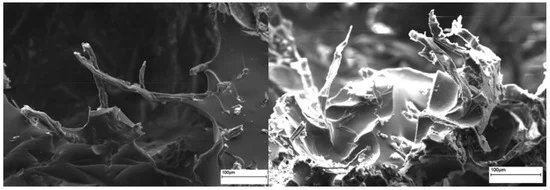
Figure 11: Open access scanning electron microscopy images of soybean oil and cellulose fiber foams.
