= Tomium =

Sharp cutting edge of a bird's beak or turtle's bill

In anatomy, the tomium is the sharp cutting edge of the beak of a bird or the bill of a turtle. Sometimes the edge is serrated for tearing through flesh or vegetation.

== See also ==
- Culmen (bird)
- Gonys
