= A. lautus =

A. lautus may refer to:

- Abacetus lautus, a ground beetle
- Aulacorhamphus lautus or Aulacorhynchus lautus, synonyms of Aulacorhynchus albivitta, the white-throated toucanet, a bird found in South America
