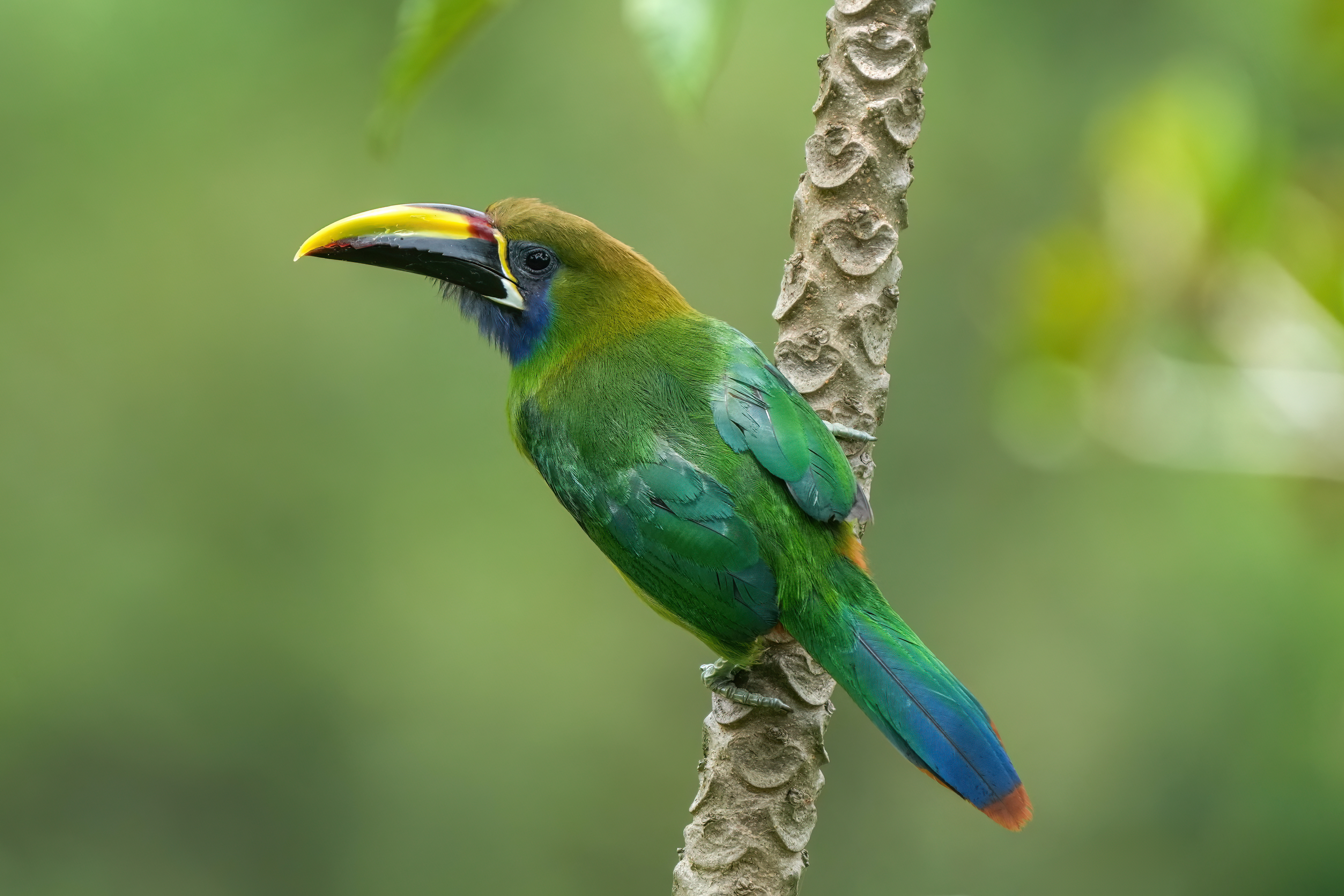
- Emerald toucanet (nominate group)

Conservation status
- Least Concern (IUCN 3.1)

Scientific classification
- Kingdom: Animalia
- Phylum: Chordata
- Class: Aves
- Order: Piciformes
- Family: Ramphastidae
- Genus: Aulacorhynchus
- Species: A. prasinus

Binomial name
- Aulacorhynchus prasinus (Gould, 1833)

Subspecies
- See text

Synonyms
- Pteroglossus prasinus

= Northern emerald toucanet =

Species of bird

The northern emerald toucanet (Aulacorhynchus prasinus) also called the Wagler’s toucanet, is a species of bird in the toucan family Ramphastidae. It occurs in montane regions from southern Mexico to southern Panama.

== Taxonomy ==
The northern emerald toucanet was formally described and illustrated in 1833 by the English ornithologist John Gould. He coined the binomial name Pteroglossus prasinus and specified the locality as Mexico. The specific epithet prasinus is Latin meaning "leek-green", from Ancient Greek πρασον/prason meaning "leek". The northern emerald toucanet is now one of eight toucanets placed in the genus Aulacorhynchus that was introduced in 1835 by Gould.

For many years the northern emerald toucanet was considered to have 14 subspecies. In 2008 the International Ornithological Committee (IOC) divided the subspecies into five species based on differences in morphology and mitochondrial DNA sequences. The species were the emerald toucanet (A. prasinus) with four subspecies, the blue-throated toucanet (A. caeruleogularis) with two subspecies, the white-throated toucanet (A. albivitta) with four subspecies, the black-throated toucanet (A. atrogularis) with three subspecies and the monotypic Wagler's toucanet (A. wagleri). In 2025, based on the relatively modest differences, AviList chose instead to recognise only two species, the northern emerald toucanet (A. prasinus) with seven subspecies and the southern emerald toucanet (A. albivitta) also with seven subspecies.

Seven subspecies are recognised:

- A. p. wagleri (Sturm, JHCF & Sturm, JW, 1841) – Sierra Madre del Sur of southwestern Mexico (Guerrero and southwestern Oaxaca)
- A. p. warneri Winker, K, 2000 – mountains of southeastern Mexico (Sierra de los Tuxtlas in southern Veracruz)
- A. p. prasinus (Gould, J, 1833) – southeastern Mexico (Veracruz, adjacent San Luis Potosí, and Oaxaca)
- A. p. virescens Ridgway, R, 1912 – southeastern Mexico, Guatemala, Belize, western El Salvador, Honduras, and northern Nicaragua
- A. p. volcanius Dickey, DR & Van Rossem, AJ, 1930 – eastern El Salvador (Volcán San Miguel)
- A. p. caeruleogularis Gould, J, 1853 – highlands of Costa Rica and western and central Panama (east to western Panamá)
- A. p. cognatus Nelson, EW, 1912 – mountains of eastern Panama (Darién Province) and adjacent Colombia

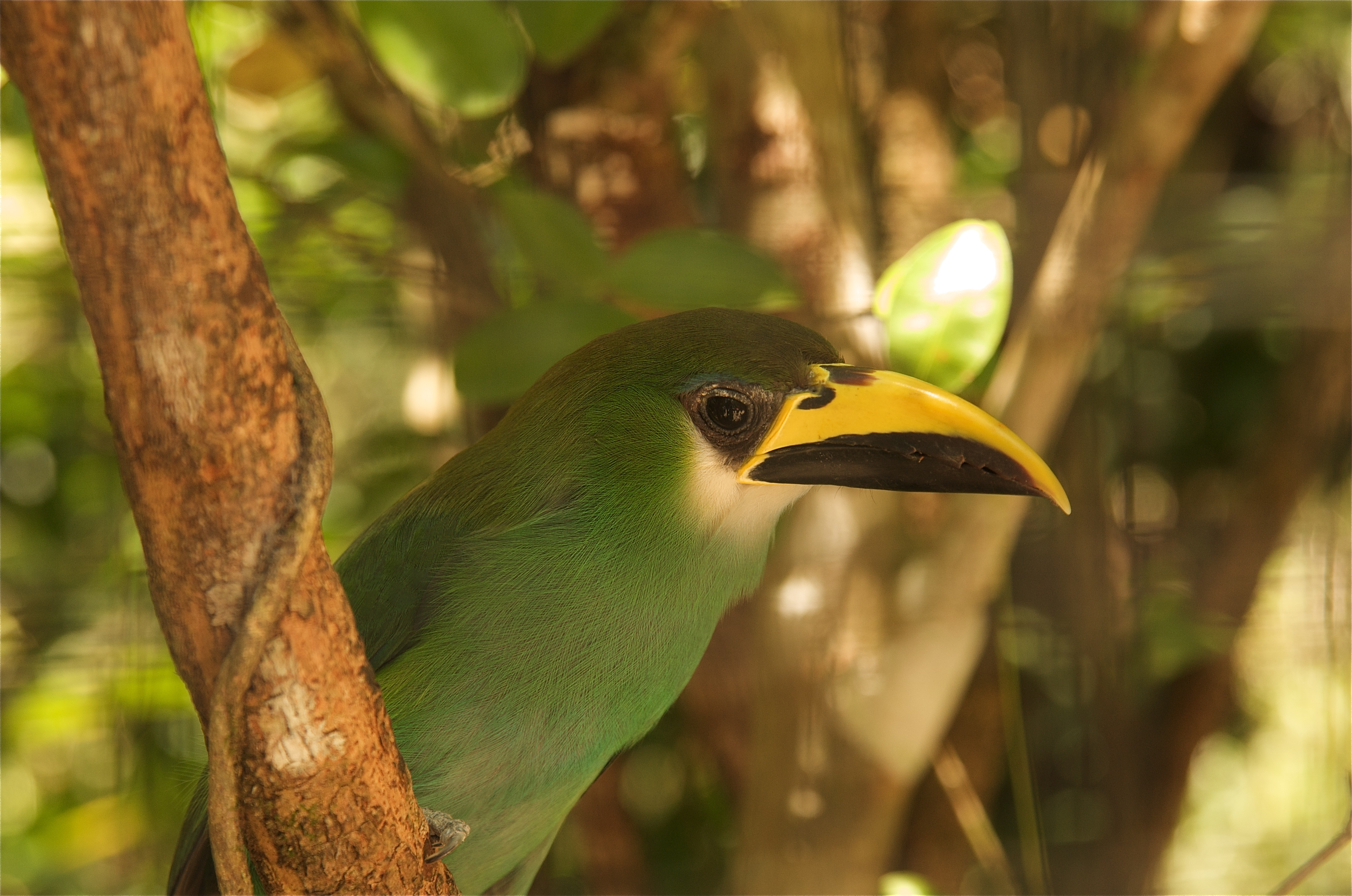
At Belize Zoo (nominate group)

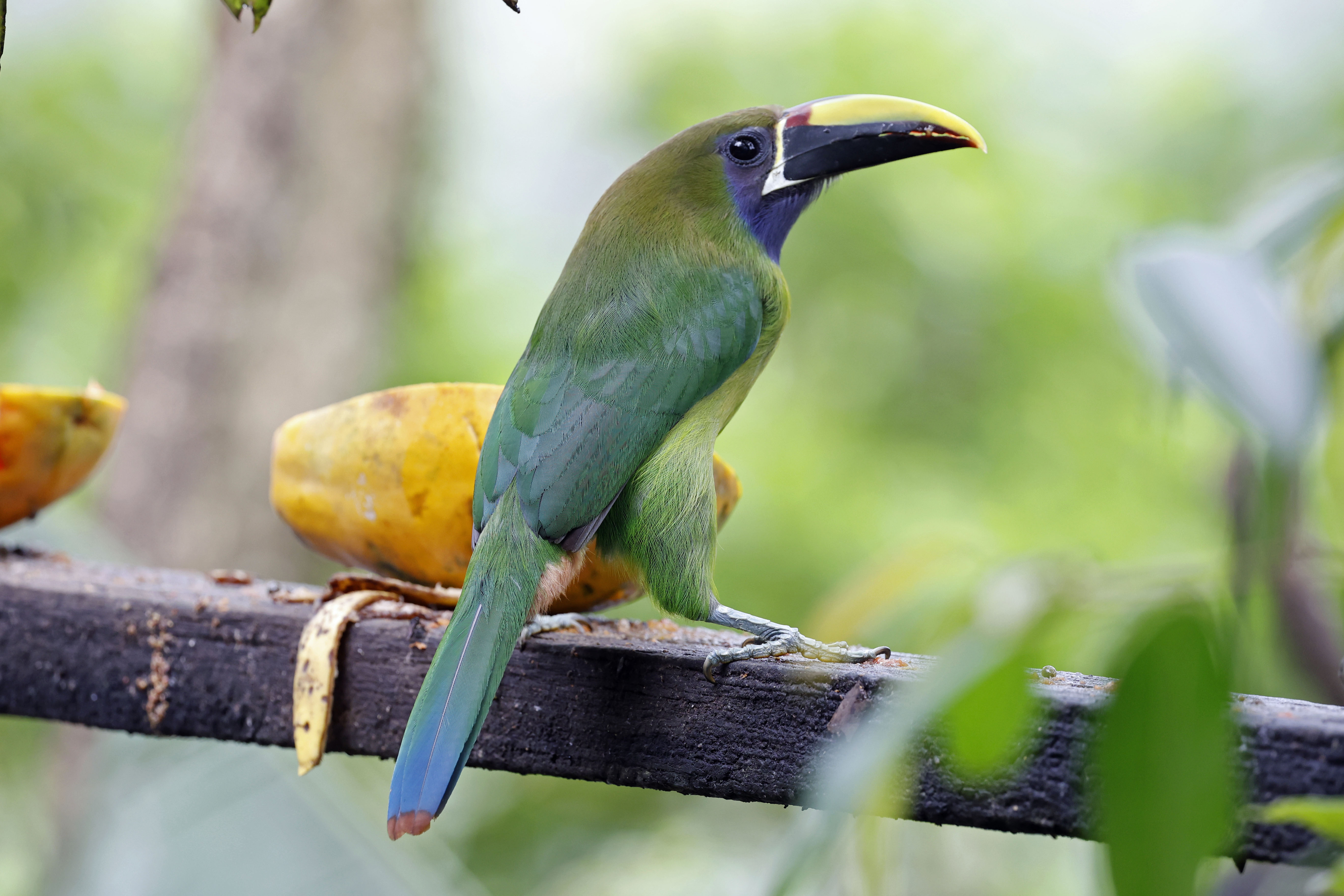
Emerald Toucanet, near Cinchona, Costa Rica

== Description ==
Like other toucans, the northern emerald toucanet is brightly marked and has a large bill. Adults are 29 to 37 cm (11 to 15 in) long and weigh about 150 to 240 g (5.3 to 8.5 oz). The sexes are alike in appearance although the female generally is smaller and shorter-billed. Their bill has a black mandible, a yellow maxilla with a black patch near the nares, and a white vertical strip at its base. All subspecies have plumage that is mainly green like that of other members of genus Aulacorhynchus, and is somewhat lighter below than above. The nominate's crown has a bronze tinge and its nape and upper back a yellowy bronze tint. Their eye is dark brown surrounded by even darker bare skin. Their lower face and throat are white. Their flanks are bright yellow-green to green-yellow and their undertail coverts and the underside of the tail are chestnut. The base of their tail's upper surface is green becoming blue towards the end and the tips of the feathers are chestnut.

The subspecies differ mainly in the color of the throat and the bill. Subspecies A. p. warneri has a yellowish wash on its throat and some yellow on the face. A. p. virescens is slightly smaller than the nominate. It has a yellower face and throat, more yellow on the flanks, and darker chestnut tips on the tail feathers. A. p. volcanius is similar to the nominate but paler overall and slightly smaller. Immatures are grayer than adults and the chestnut of the tail tips is browner and smaller.

== Distribution and habitat ==
The northern emerald toucanet primarily inhabits humid montane forest but is also found in more open landscapes like secondary forest, shrublands, pastures, and plantations. In elevation it ranges from near sea level to at least 3,000 m (9,800 ft). It is non-migratory.

== Behavior ==
=== Social behavior ===
The northern emerald toucanet is gregarious and frequently gathers in groups of up to about 10.

=== Feeding ===
The northern emerald toucanet forages by gleaning, usually while perched. Its diet is eclectic and includes a wide variety of fruits, invertebrates of many orders, and vertebrate prey such as birds, eggs, lizards, and snakes.

=== Breeding ===
The northern emerald toucanet's breeding season is from March to July. It nests in tree cavities, either natural or those abandoned by woodpeckers. They can be as high as 27 m (89 ft) above the ground. The typical clutch size is three or four but can range from one to five. Both sexes incubate the eggs but the female does so more than the male. The incubation period is 16 days and fledging occurs 42 to 45 days after hatching.

=== Vocal and non-vocal sounds ===
The northern emerald toucanet's call is "a nasal, barking Wok!-Wok!-Wok!-Wok!-Wok!-Wok!-Wok!...". It also makes "a growling, throaty wra'a'a'a'a'a'ak".

== Conservation status ==
The IUCN has assessed the northern emerald toucanet as being of Least Concern. It has a very large range but its population size is not known and is believed to be decreasing. No immeditate threats have been identified. However, it "is vulnerable to habitat destruction".

== Relationship to humans ==
=== Aviculture ===
The northern emerald toucanet is a popular pet toucan. It is affectionate when hand-fed and loves to play and interact with its owner. Emerald toucanets are as quick to learn tricks as cockatoos. They are active and need a large cage for their size, including perches that they can hop back and forth on. They also require a high-fruit diet, without which they are susceptible to a disease of excessive iron storage that is similar to hemochromatosis in humans.
