= Andean toucanet =

Andean toucanet may refer to:

- Black-throated toucanet, a species of toucan found in central Ecuador to western Bolivia
- White-throated toucanet, a species of toucan found in the Andes from western Venezuela, through Colombia to northern Ecuador
