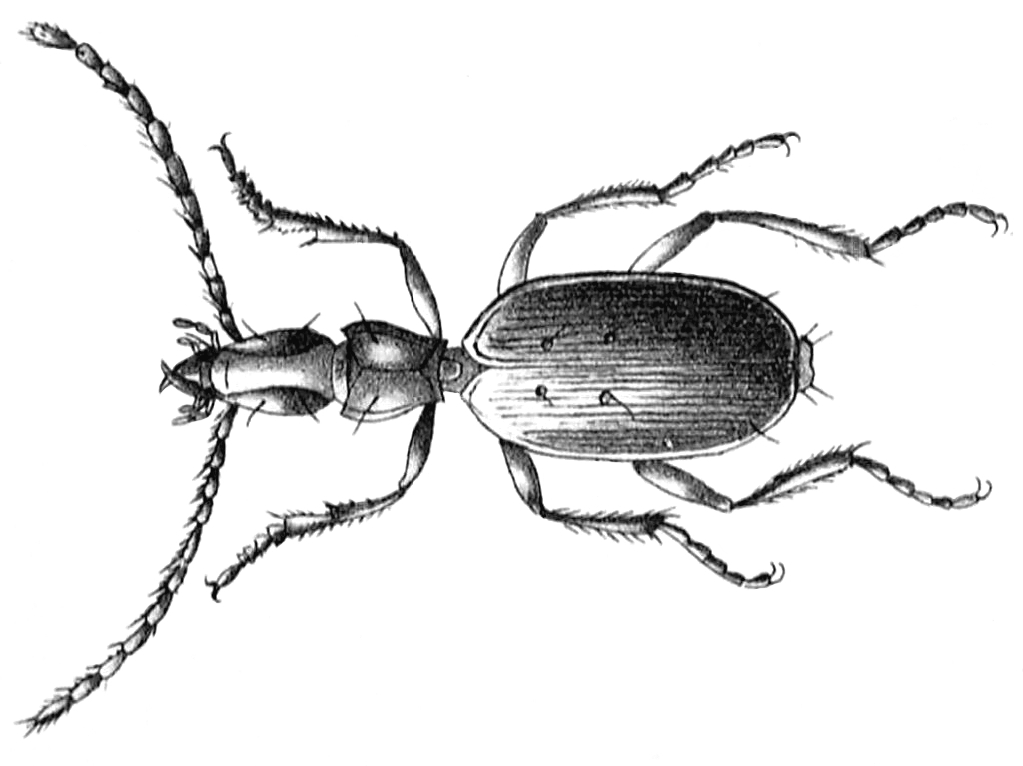

Scientific classification
- Kingdom: Animalia
- Phylum: Arthropoda
- Class: Insecta
- Order: Coleoptera
- Suborder: Adephaga
- Family: Carabidae
- Genus: Anophthalmus
- Species: A. schmidti

Binomial name
- Anophthalmus schmidti Sturm, 1844

= Anophthalmus schmidti =

Species of beetle

Anophthalmus schmidti is a species of ground beetle endemic to Europe. It is found in Croatia, mainland Italy, and Slovenia. It lives in caves.
