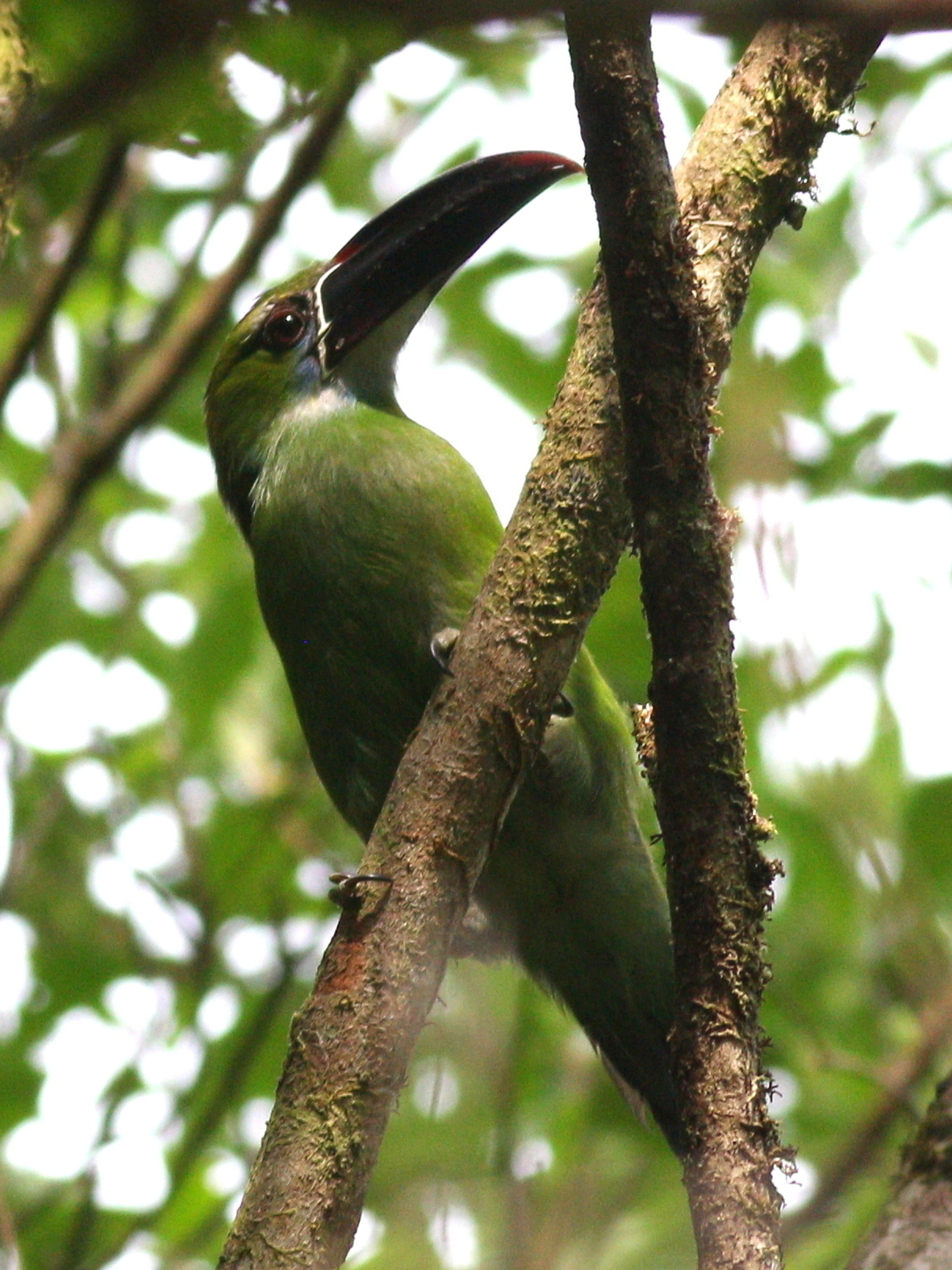

Conservation status
- Least Concern (IUCN 3.1)

Scientific classification
- Kingdom: Animalia
- Phylum: Chordata
- Class: Aves
- Order: Piciformes
- Family: Ramphastidae
- Genus: Aulacorhynchus
- Species: A. derbianus

Binomial name
- Aulacorhynchus derbianus Gould, 1835

= Chestnut-tipped toucanet =

Species of bird

The chestnut-tipped toucanet (Aulacorhynchus derbianus) is a bird in the toucan family Ramphastidae. It is found in Bolivia, Colombia, Ecuador, and Peru.

== Taxonomy and systematics ==
The chestnut-tipped toucanet is monotypic. However, what is now the tepui toucanet (A. whitelianus) and it were for a time considered conspecific. They were separated by major taxonomic systems beginning in 2011. The chestnut-tipped and groove-billed toucanets (A. sulcatus) form a superspecies.

== Description ==
The chestnut-tipped toucanet is 33 to 41 cm (13 to 16 in) long and weighs 141 to 262 g (5.0 to 9.2 oz). Its bill is deep red and black with a vertical white line at its base and grooves on the maxilla. (Some individuals have an all-black bill). The sexes are alike. Their plumage is generally green, with a bluish nape, a white throat, and wide chestnut tips on the tail feathers. The red-brown eye has some blue below it.

== Distribution and habitat ==
The chestnut-tipped toucanet is found along the east slope of the Andes from extreme southern Colombia through Ecuador and Peru into western Bolivia as far as Cochabamba Department. It primarily inhabits subtropical montane cloudforest, but also tropical forest in Bolivia. In elevation it mostly ranges between 600 and 2,000 m (2,000 and 6,600 ft).

== Behavior ==
=== Movement ===
The chestnut-tipped toucanet is believed to be non-migratory.

=== Feeding ===
The chestnut-tipped toucanet forages mostly in the canopy, typically in pairs but occasionally in groups as large as 10 individuals. Its diet is not known in detail but appears to be mostly fruits and their seeds with some insects also taken.

=== Breeding ===
The chestnut-tipped toucanet's breeding season appears to be from May to October. Nothing else is known about its breeding biology.

=== Vocalization ===
The chestnut-tipped toucanet's song is an "often long series of grrrrump to kwuk notes", which pairs often sing together. It also makes "'ggg-rgg', 'ngg-ngg', and rattling 'bbdt-bbdt' notes."

== Status ==
The IUCN has assessed the chestnut-tipped toucanet as being of Least Concern. It has a large range but its population size is not known and is believed to be decreasing. No immediate threats have been identified. It is considered common in some limited areas but overall uncommon to rare in Ecuador and rare in Peru.
