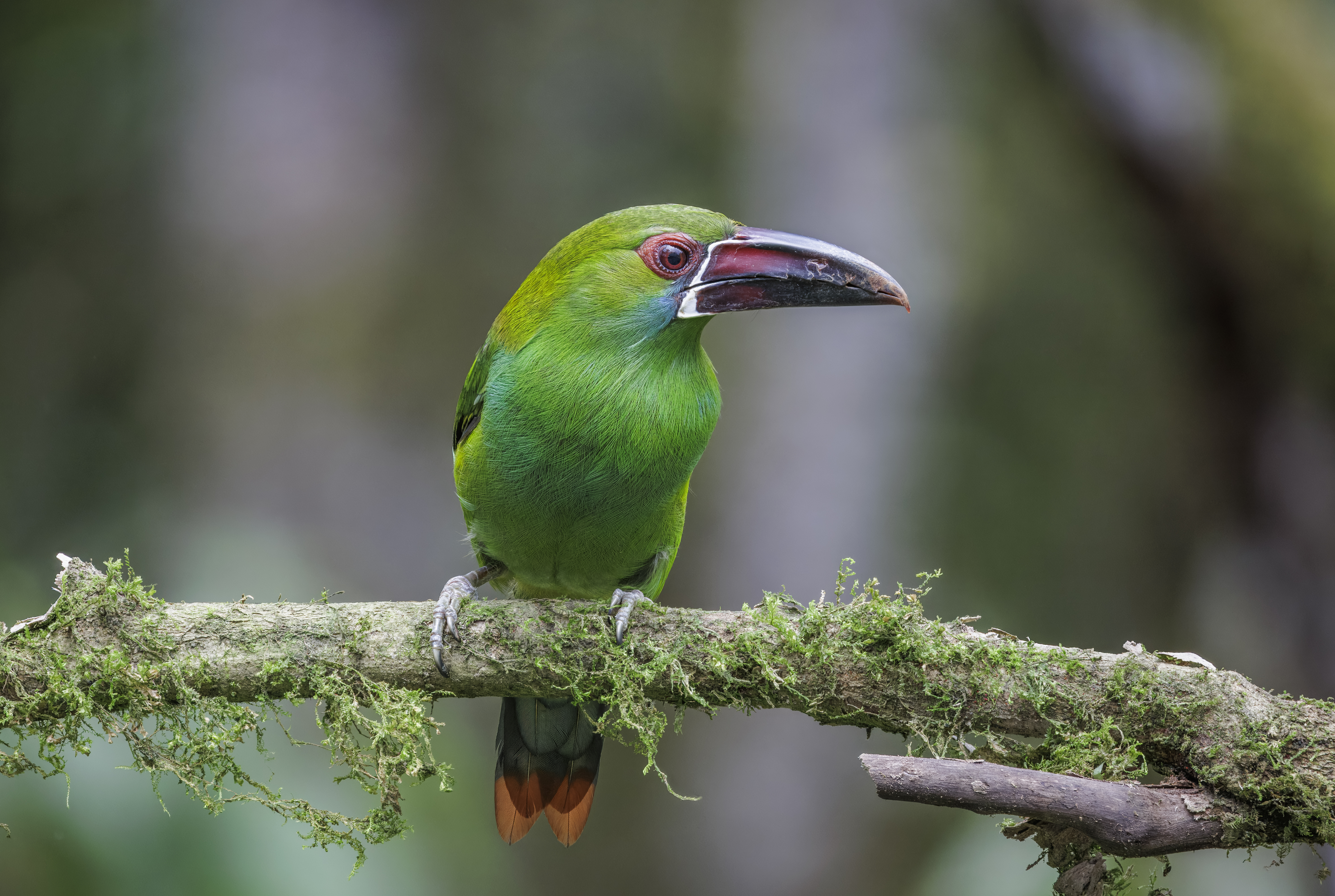

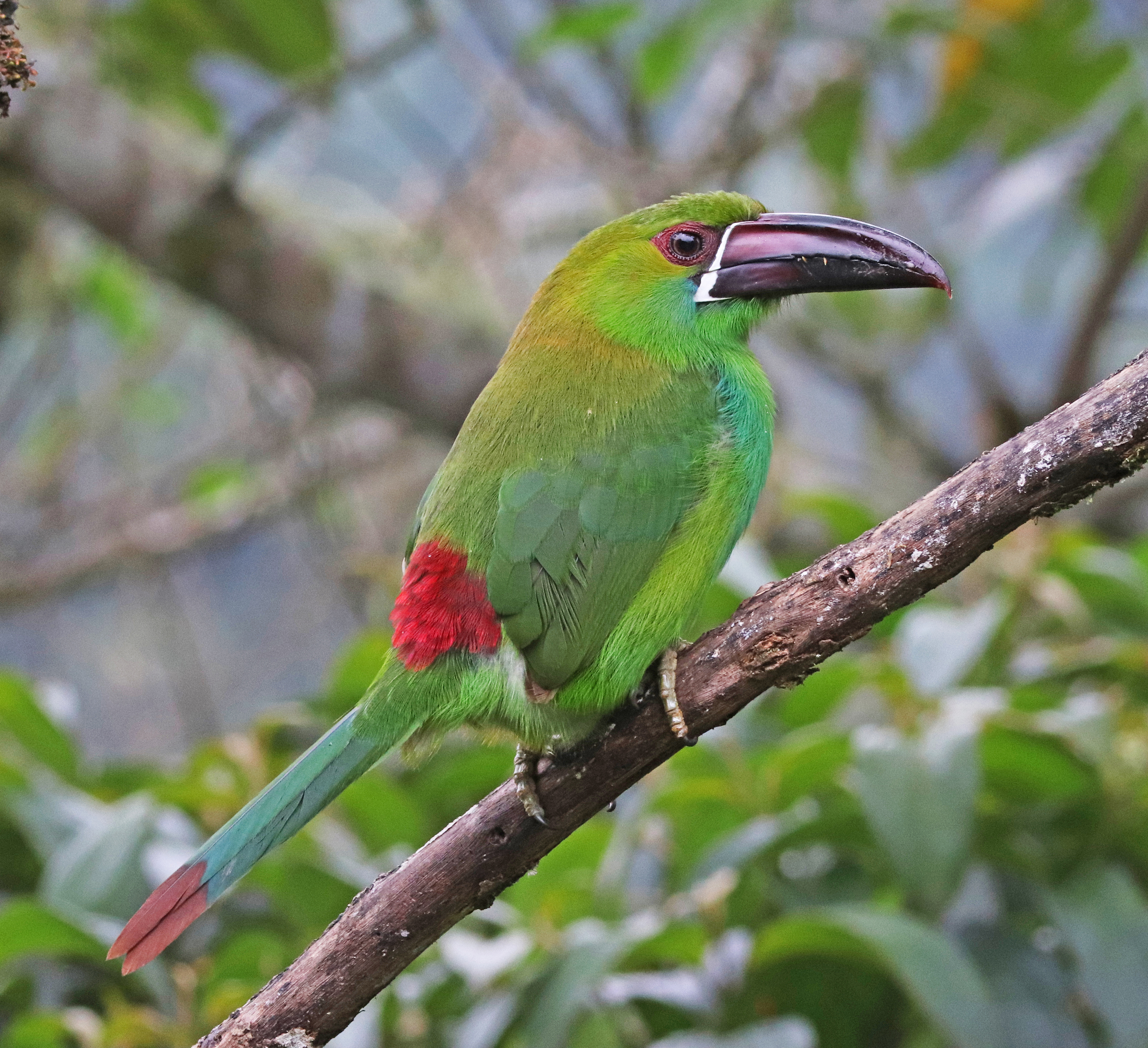
- both A. h. sexnotatus in northwestern Ecuador

Conservation status
- Least Concern (IUCN 3.1)

Scientific classification
- Kingdom: Animalia
- Phylum: Chordata
- Class: Aves
- Order: Piciformes
- Family: Ramphastidae
- Genus: Aulacorhynchus
- Species: A. haematopygus

Binomial name
- Aulacorhynchus haematopygus (Gould, 1835)

Subspecies
- See text

Synonyms
- Pteroglossus haematopygus

= Crimson-rumped toucanet =

Species of bird

The crimson-rumped toucanet (Aulacorhynchus haematopygus) is a bird in the toucan family Ramphastidae. It is found in Colombia, Ecuador, and Venezuela.

== Taxonomy and systematics ==
The crimson-rumped toucanet was originally described in the genus Pteroglossus. Two subspecies are recognized, the nominate A. h. haematopygus (Gould, 1835) and A. h. sexnotatus Gould, 1868.

== Description ==
The crimson-rumped toucanet is 40 to 45 cm (16 to 18 in) long. The nominate subspecies weighs 200 to 232 g (7.1 to 8.2 oz) and A. h. sexnotatus 141 to 200 g (5.0 to 7.1 oz). Their bill is brownish red and black with a vertical white line at the base; the nominate has a larger proportion of black than A. h. sexnotatus. Males and females have the same plumage but females have a shorter bill than males. Adults of both subspecies are mostly green with a gold gloss to the nape and upper back, a red rump, chestnut tips on the central two or three pairs of tail feathers, and bare orange-brown skin around the dark eye. The nominate has blue above and below the eye and on the sides of the breast. A. h. sexnotatus has less blue in those areas. Immatures are duller overall, with an orangey rump and a mostly reddish bill without a white basal line.

== Distribution and habitat ==
The nominate subspecies of crimson-rumped toucanet is found from western Venezuela's Serranía del Perijá south on both slopes of the Andes through northern and central Colombia to its southwest. Its range might extend into northern Ecuador on the eastern slope of the Andes. A. h. sexnotatus is found on the western slope of Colombia's Western Andes in Nariño Department and south to Loja Province in Ecuador. The species primarily inhabits evergreen forest from the lowlands to the montane zone and is also found in semi-open landscapes like forest edges, secondary forest, and isolated fruiting trees in pastures and gardens. In elevation it mostly ranges between 300 and 2,200 m (980 and 7,200 ft) but is found as high as 2,750 m (9,000 ft).

== Behavior ==
=== Movement ===
The crimson-rumped toucanet is apparently sedentary; no movements are known.

=== Feeding ===
The crimson-rumped toucanet forages at all levels of the forest, alone, in pairs, or in a small group. Its diet is primarily fruit and probably also includes insects and bird eggs.

=== Breeding ===
The crimson-rumped toucanet's main breeding season spans from January to May but can begin as early as November in southern Colombia and Ecuador. During pair formation both sexes sing, call, chase, feed each other, and allopreen. They are believed to usually nest in an abandoned woodpecker hole. In captivity the clutch size is up to four eggs, the incubation period 16 to 17 days, and the time to fledging about four to five weeks after hatch.

=== Vocal and non-vocal sounds ===
The crimson-rumped toucanet's song is a "[s]eries of variable, gruff, barking notes, 'daakk' to 'gggruk'" and is sung by both sexes, sometimes in duet. They also make "soft, long notes, rattle notes, [and] interactive 'snark' calls". When interacting, members of a pair make "loud wing sounds".

== Status ==
The IUCN has assessed the crimson-rumped toucanet as being of Least Concern. It has a large range, and though its population size is not known it is believed to be stable. No immediate threats have been identified. It is considered common in Colombia and fairly common in Ecuador, and occurs in protected areas in both countries. It appears "to be adaptable, using secondary forest even in patches" and breeds successfully in captivity.
