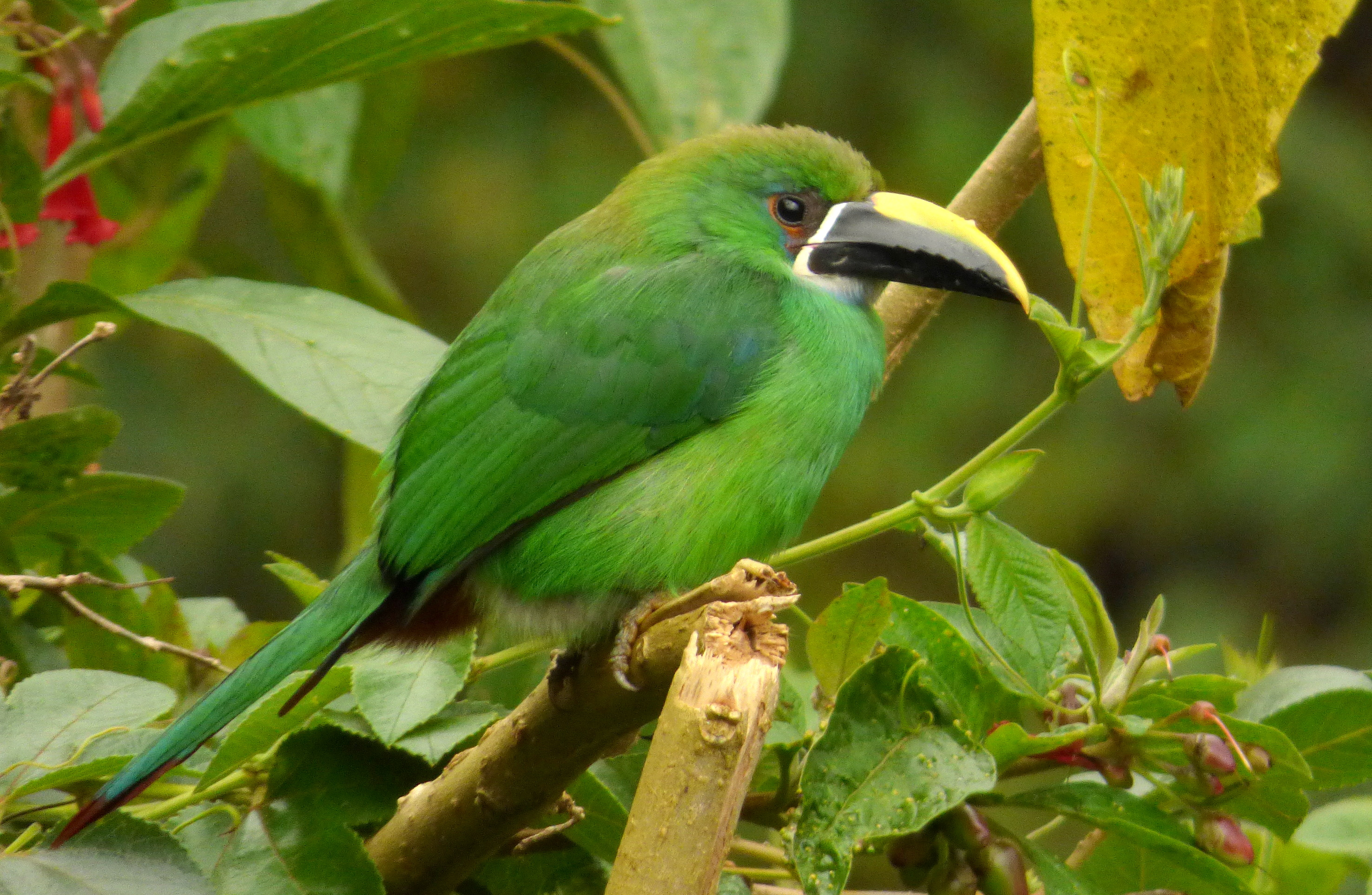

Conservation status
- Least Concern (IUCN 3.1)

Scientific classification
- Kingdom: Animalia
- Phylum: Chordata
- Class: Aves
- Order: Piciformes
- Family: Ramphastidae
- Genus: Aulacorhynchus
- Species: A. albivitta

Binomial name
- Aulacorhynchus albivitta (Boissonneau, 1840)

Subspecies
- See text

Synonyms
- Aulacorhynchus prasinus albivitta; Pteroglossus albivitta

= Southern emerald toucanet =

Species of bird

The southern emerald toucanet (Aulacorhynchus albivitta) is a bird in the toucan family Ramphastidae. It is found in montane regions of Colombia, Ecuador, western Venezuela, Peru and northern Bolivia.

== Taxonomy ==
The southern emerald toucanet was formally described in 1840 as Pteroglossus albivitta by the French ornithologist Auguste Boissonneau based on a specimen collected in Bogotá, Colombia. The specific epithet combines Latin albus meaning "white" with vitta meaning "band" or "head-band". The southern emerald toucanet is now one of eight toucanets placed in the genus Aulacorhynchus that was introduced in 1835 by John Gould.

For many years what was then known as the emerald toucanet was considered to have 14 subspecies. In 2008 the International Ornithological Committee (IOC) divided the subspecies into five species based on differences in morphology and mitochondrial DNA sequences. The five species were the emerald toucanet (A. prasinus) with four subspecies, the blue-throated toucanet (A. caeruleogularis) with two subspecies, the white-throated toucanet (A. albivitta) with four subspecies, the black-throated toucanet (A. atrogularis) with three subspecies and the monotypic Wagler's toucanet (A. wagleri). In 2025, based on the relatively modest differences, AviList chose instead to recognise only two species, the northern emerald toucanet (A. prasinus) with seven subspecies and the southern emerald toucanet (A. albivitta) also with seven subspecies.

Seven subspecies are recognised:

- A. a. lautus Bangs, O, 1898 – Santa Marta Mountains (northeastern Colombia)
- A. a. griseigularis Chapman, FM, 1915 – northern end of western Andes and west slope of central Andes of Colombia
- A. a. phaeolaemus Gould, J, 1874 – subtropical western Andes of Colombia
- A. a. albivitta (Boissonneau, A, 1840) – eastern and central Andes of Colombia, eastern Ecuador, and western Venezuela
- A. a. cyanolaemus (Gould, J, 1866) – subtropical Andes of southeastern Ecuador and northern Peru
- A. a. dimidiatus Ridgway, R, 1886 – foothills of the Andes and adjacent western Amazonia in southeastern Peru and northern Bolivia
- A. a. atrogularis (Sturm, JHCF & Sturm, JW, 1841) – east slope of the Andes from central Peru to Bolivia (south to western Santa Cruz)

== Description ==
Like other toucans, the southern emerald toucanet is brightly marked and has a large bill. Adults are 33 to 38 cm (13 to 15 in) long and weigh about 160 to 230 g (5.6 to 8.1 oz). The sexes are alike in appearance although the female generally is smaller and shorter-billed. Their bill is black with a wide yellow stripe along its culmen and a white vertical strip at its base. Subspecies A. a. albivitta and A. a. phaeolaemus have some chestnut or maroon at the base of the culmen. All the subspecies have plumage that is mainly green like that of other members of genus Aulacorhynchus, and is somewhat lighter below than above. The nominate A. a. albivitta has a white throat. It has bare yellow to orange skin around the dark eye that is further surrounded by blue feathers. Subspecies A. a. lautus has a pale gray throat and bare orange-brown or gray skin around the eye. A. a. phaeolaemus has a pale blue throat and A. a. griseigularis a gray throat. All subspecies have olive green legs and feet with dusky yellow soles.

== Distribution and habitat ==
The southern emerald toucanet primarily inhabits the interior of humid montane forest but is also found in more open landscapes like the forest's edge, secondary forest, plantations, and clearings with scattered trees.

== Behavior ==
=== Movement ===
The southern emerald toucanet is non-migratory.

=== Social behavior ===
The southern emerald toucanet is gregarious and frequently gathers in small groups.

=== Feeding ===
The southern emerald toucanet forages by gleaning in the middle to upper levels of the forest, usually while perched. Its diet is eclectic and includes a wide variety of fruits, terrestrial invertebrates, and small vertebrate prey.

=== Breeding ===
Little is known about the southern emerald toucanet's breeding biology. Its nesting season in Colombia and Venezuela is from January to September and in Ecuador from September to November. It nests in a tree cavity like others of its family.

=== Vocal and non-vocal sounds ===
The southern emerald toucanet's vocalizations seem to vary across its range. Authors describe it as "a rapid ser[ies] of short took or churt notes" in Colombia, as "a guttural, grinding grá-val, grá-val, grá-val...varied to roouk, roouk, roouk" in Venezuela, and "a persistent and fast rek-rek-rek-rek or rr-rek, rr-rek, rr-rek" in Ecuador. In flight its wings make a whirring sound.

== Status ==
The IUCN has assessed the southern emerald toucanet as being of Least Concern. It has a large range, but its population size is not known and is believed to be decreasing. No immediate threats have been identified. It is "vulnerable to habitat destruction".
