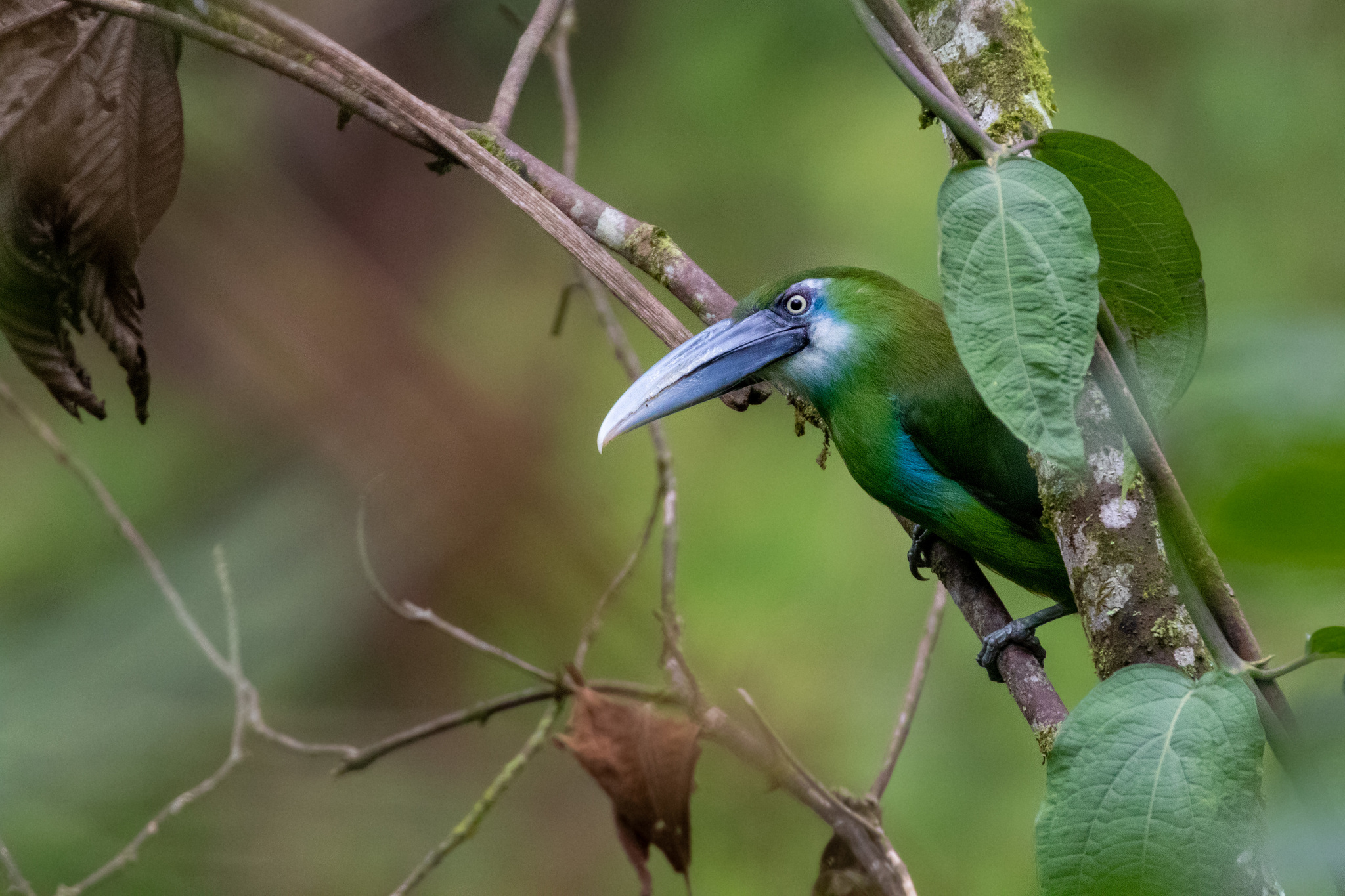

Conservation status
- Least Concern (IUCN 3.1)

Scientific classification
- Kingdom: Animalia
- Phylum: Chordata
- Class: Aves
- Order: Piciformes
- Family: Ramphastidae
- Genus: Aulacorhynchus
- Species: A. coeruleicinctis

Binomial name
- Aulacorhynchus coeruleicinctis D'Orbigny, 1840

Synonyms
- Aulacorhynchus coerulei-cinctis

= Blue-banded toucanet =

Species of bird

The blue-banded toucanet (Aulacorhynchus coeruleicinctis) is a bird in the toucan family Ramphastidae. It is found in Bolivia and Peru.

== Taxonomy and systematics ==
The blue-banded toucanet is monotypic.

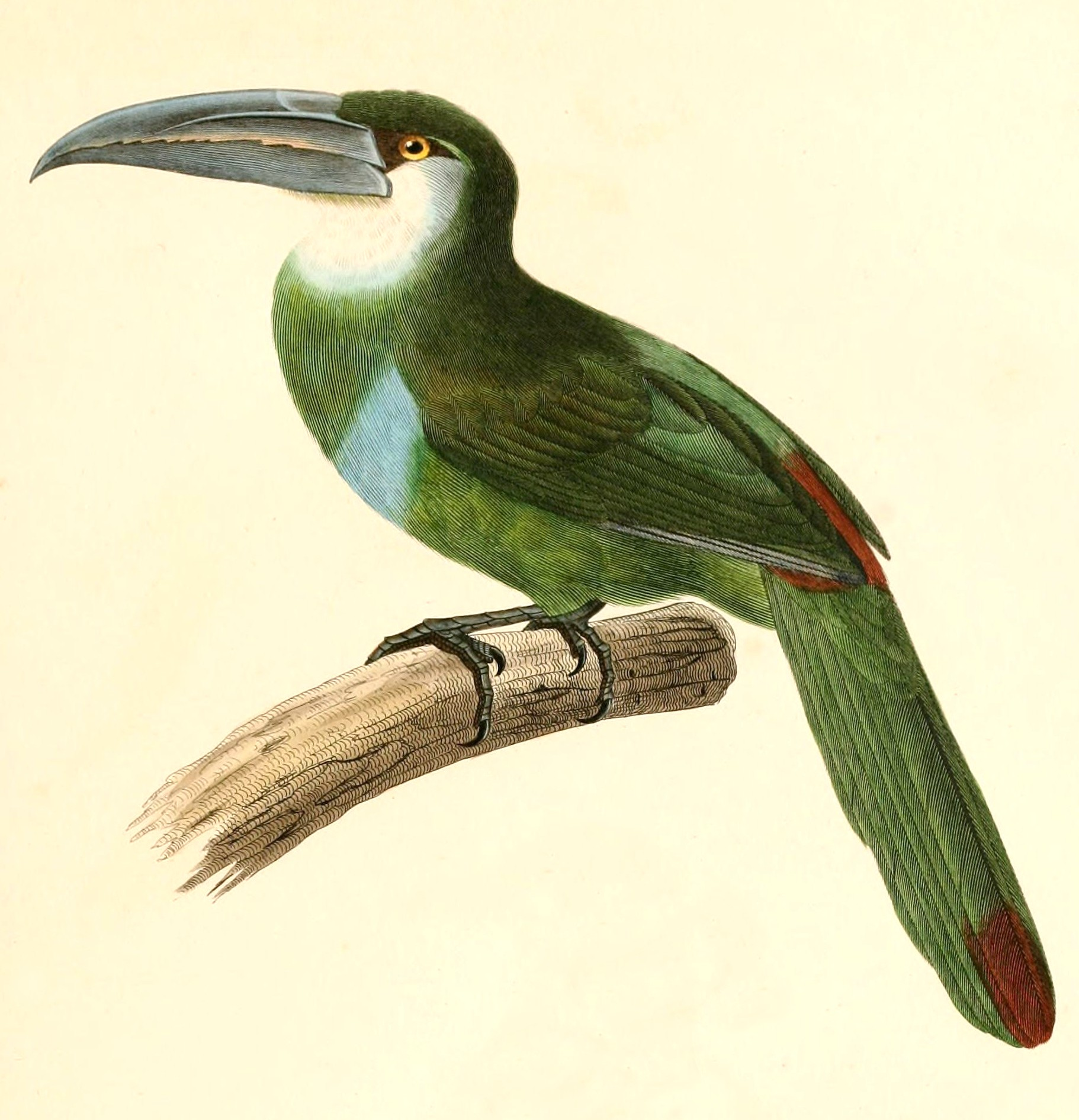
Illustration from Voyage dans l'Amérique méridionale by Alcide Dessalines d'Orbigny

== Description ==
The blue-banded toucanet is 40 to 44 cm (16 to 17 in) long and weighs 173 to 257 g (6.1 to 9.1 oz). The sexes are alike. Adults have a bluish horn-colored bill. Their plumage is mostly green with a red rump, white throat, a diffuse blue band across the chest, and greenish-yellow undertail coverts. They have a blue and white supercilium and some pale blue below the eye. Their eye can be any color from white through yellow to reddish brown and is surrounded by bare dark grayish skin. Their tail is mostly green with rusty tips on the central feathers. Immatures are duller than adults but otherwise similar.

== Distribution and habitat ==
The blue-banded toucanet is mostly found on the east slope of the Andes from central Peru's Department of Huánuco south to Santa Cruz Department in Bolivia. It also occurs in a few isolated areas further east. It inhabits moist subtropical montane forest and cloudforest. In elevation it is known between 1,470 and 3,050 m (4,800 and 10,000 ft) but is usually found from 1,600 to 2,500 m (5,200 to 8,200 ft).

== Behavior ==
=== Movement ===
The blue-banded toucanet's movements, if any, are not known.

=== Feeding ===
The blue-banded toucanet forages at all levels of the forest, alone, in pairs, or in a small group. Its diet not well known but is primarily fruit and also includes insects and other arthropods.

=== Breeding ===
The yellow-browed toucanet's nesting season appears to span from January to April or later in Peru and from August to January in Bolivia. Nothing else is known about its breeding biology.

=== Vocalization ===
The blue-banded toucanet's song is "a series of barking, growling, variable notes, 'kunnk' to 'krakk'". It also makes "various rattle calls, 'kyak' yelps, a 'kra-a-a' and 'gek-ek-ek' compound notes."

== Status ==
The IUCN has assessed the blue-banded toucanet as being of Least Concern. It has a large range, but its population size is not known and is believed to be decreasing. No immediate threats have been identified. It is considered "generally uncommon" in Peru. "Studies [are] required on its breeding biology and ecology."
