= Oskar Scheibel =

Austrian entomologist

Oskar Scheibel (1881–1953) was an Austrian engineer and amateur entomologist who specialized in the beetles of the Yugoslavian region and specialized in cave beetles of the family Trechinae. One of the most famous beetles that he described as new to science was the now endangered blind cave beetle that he named as Anophthalmus hitleri after Adolf Hitler.

== Biography ==
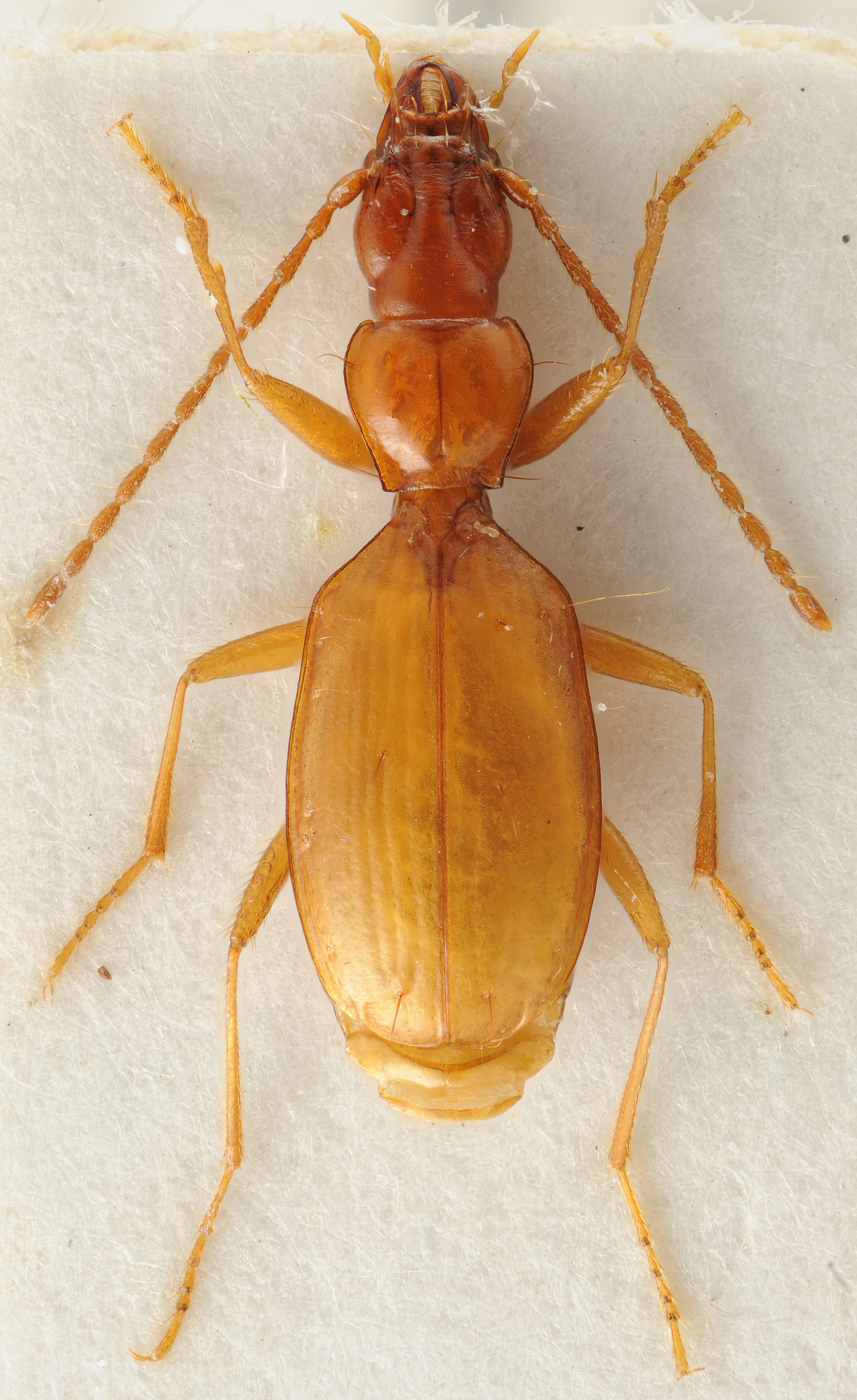
Anophthalmus hitleri

Scheibel was born in Austria in 1881 and little is known of his early life but he became a railway engineer in the Austro-Hungarian region where he took an interest in cave beetles. He collected many new species and described a few himself while other entomologists named some species in his honor based on specimens that he had collected. He sold his collections of about 15,000 specimens in 1921 to Germany.

He is best remembered for naming in honor of Adolf Hitler the beetle species Anophthalmus hitleri in 1937. The beetle is now endangered and known from just five caves in Slovenia.

Part of his insect collection is now at the Natural History Museum Basel as part of the G. Frey Collection.
