= De Fructibus et Seminibus Plantarum =

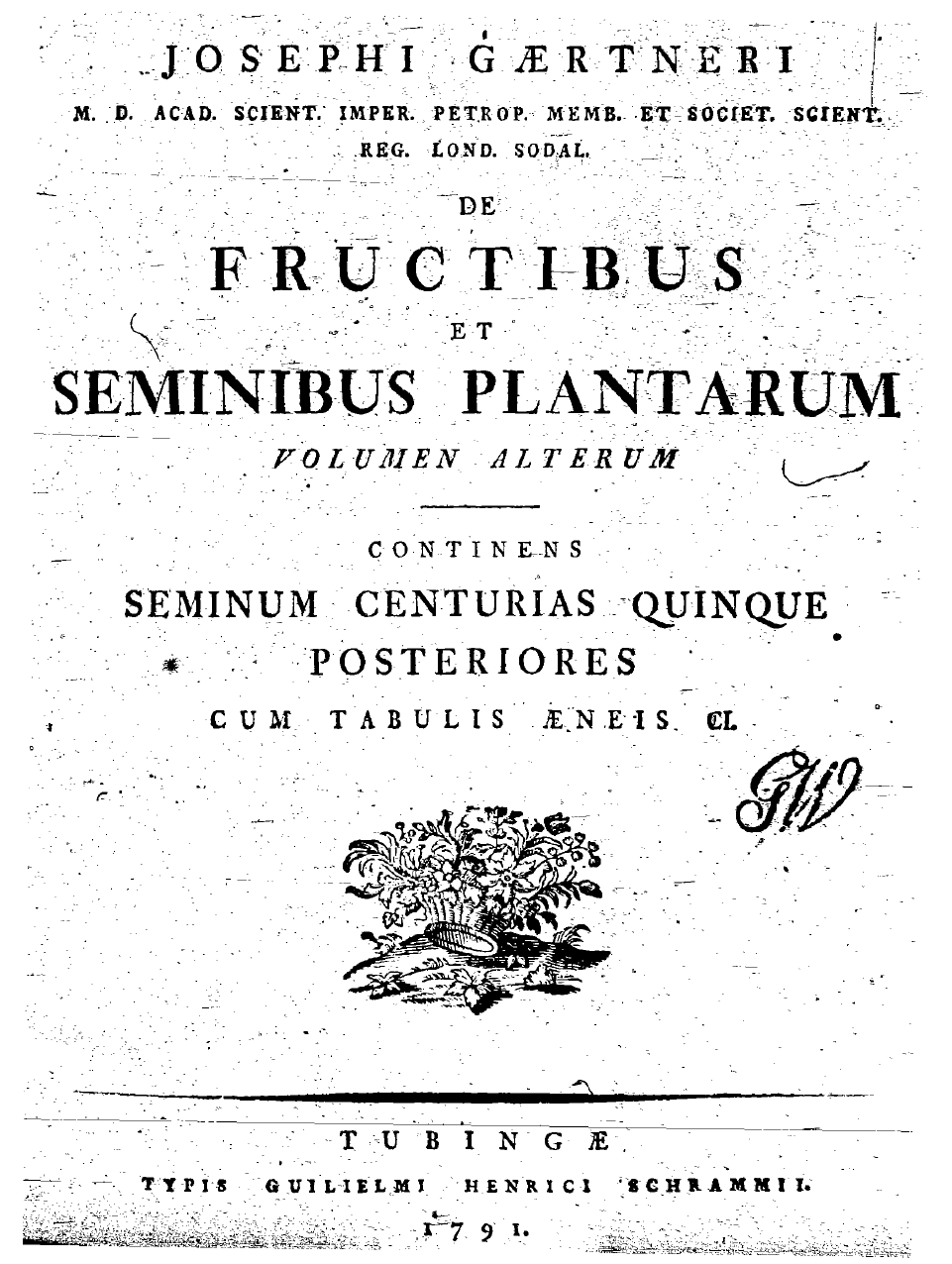
Frontispiece of De Fructibus et Seminibus Plantarum

De Fructibus et Seminibus Plantarum, also known by its standard botanical abbreviation Fruct. Sem. Pl., is a three-volume botanic treatise by Joseph Gaertner. The first volume was published in December 1788. The second volume was published in four parts, in 1790, 1791, 1791, and 1792 respectively. A third volume was published after Gaertner's death by his son Karl Friedrich von Gaertner from 1805 to 1807; this final volume is also known as 'Supplementum Carpologicae', abbreviated as Suppl. Carp.. Most of the illustrations for the work were done by Johann Georg Sturm (1742-1793).

De Fructibus was based on specimens of over a thousand genera, including Australian and Pacific specimens from the collection of Sir Joseph Banks, and South African specimens from the collection of Carl Peter Thunberg. It was essentially a study of fruits and seeds, but the resultant classification was outstanding for its time.

Julius von Sachs claimed that the work "forms an epoch in the history of botany", writing

"[Gaertner]'s great work was at once an inexhaustible mine of single well-ascertained facts, and a guide to the morphology of the organs of fructification and to its application to systematic botany.... [T]he whole theory of the flower was thus placed upon a better basis.... Gärtner's theory of the seed is one of his most valuable contributions to the science.... [H]is views far surpass in clearness and consistency all that had hitherto been taught on the subject."
