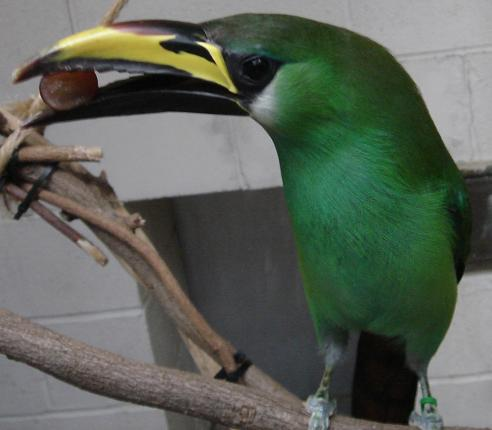
- Emerald toucanet (Aulacorhynchus prasinus)

Scientific classification
- Kingdom: Animalia
- Phylum: Chordata
- Class: Aves
- Order: Piciformes
- Family: Ramphastidae
- Genus: Aulacorhynchus; Gould, 1835

Type species
- Pteroglossus sulcatus Swainson, 1820

Species
- see text

Synonyms
- Aulacorhamphus

= Green toucanets =

Green toucanet

Genus of birds

Green toucanets are birds from the genus Aulacorhynchus in the toucan family. They are native to Mexico, and Central and South America. All are found in humid forests and woodlands in highlands, but a few also occur in adjacent lowlands. They are relatively small toucans, 30–44 centimetres (12–17 in) long, with colorful, mainly green, plumage. They are typically seen in pairs or small groups, and sometimes follow mixed species flocks.

== Taxonomy ==
The genus Aulacorhynchus was introduced in 1835 by the English ornithologist John Gould. The name combines the Ancient Greek αυλαξ/aulax, αυλακος/aulakos meaning "furrow" with ῥυγχος/rhunkhos meaning "bill". The type species was designated as Pteroglossuis sulcatus Swainson by George Gray in 1840.

A major taxonomy review in 1974 resulted in 6 species in the genus Aulacorhynchus, and this was adopted by virtually all later authorities.

In 2001, it was suggested that A. prasinus, as traditionally defined, was a species complex that should be split into 7 different species based on preliminary morphological evidence. This was to some extent supported by genetic evidence, which suggested that additional species should be recognized. As a result, A. griseigularis was split from in A. albivitta based on this early genetic evidence but these species are now lumped together again.

Currently, there remains a considerable lack of consensus to support the IOC's latest taxonomy of Aulacorhynchus into eleven species. Several authorities still maintain that the genus Aulacorhynchus has only 7 species and treat the remaining as subspecies. The SACC has called for further genetic studies of this genus.

=== Species ===
The genus contains eight species:

Image	Scientific name	Common name	Distribution
	Aulacorhynchus prasinus	Northern emerald toucanet	Mexico and Central America
	Aulacorhynchus albivitta	Southern emerald toucanet	Andes from western Venezuela, through Colombia to northern Ecuador
	Aulacorhynchus sulcatus	Groove-billed toucanet	eastern Colombia and northern Venezuela
	Aulacorhynchus derbianus	Chestnut-tipped toucanet	Colombia to central Bolivia
	Aulacorhynchus whitelianus	Tepui toucanet	Guiana
	Aulacorhynchus haematopygus	Crimson-rumped toucanet	Ecuador, Colombia and Venezuela
	Aulacorhynchus huallagae	Yellow-browed toucanet	east Andean slope in northern Peru.
	Aulacorhynchus coeruleicinctis	Blue-banded toucanet	Bolivia and Peru.
