= Johann Georg Sturm =

German illustrator (1742–1793)

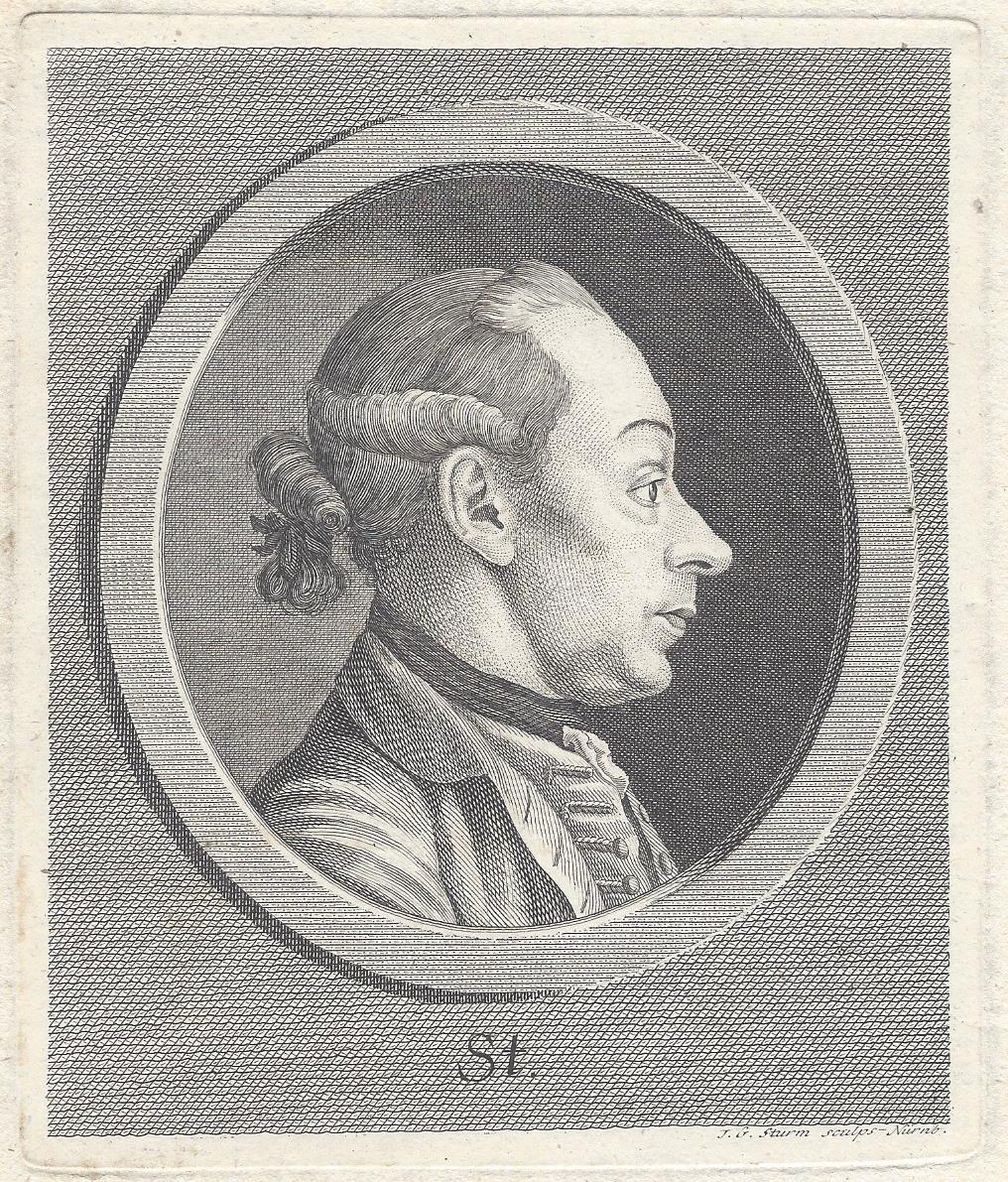
Self portrait, 1775

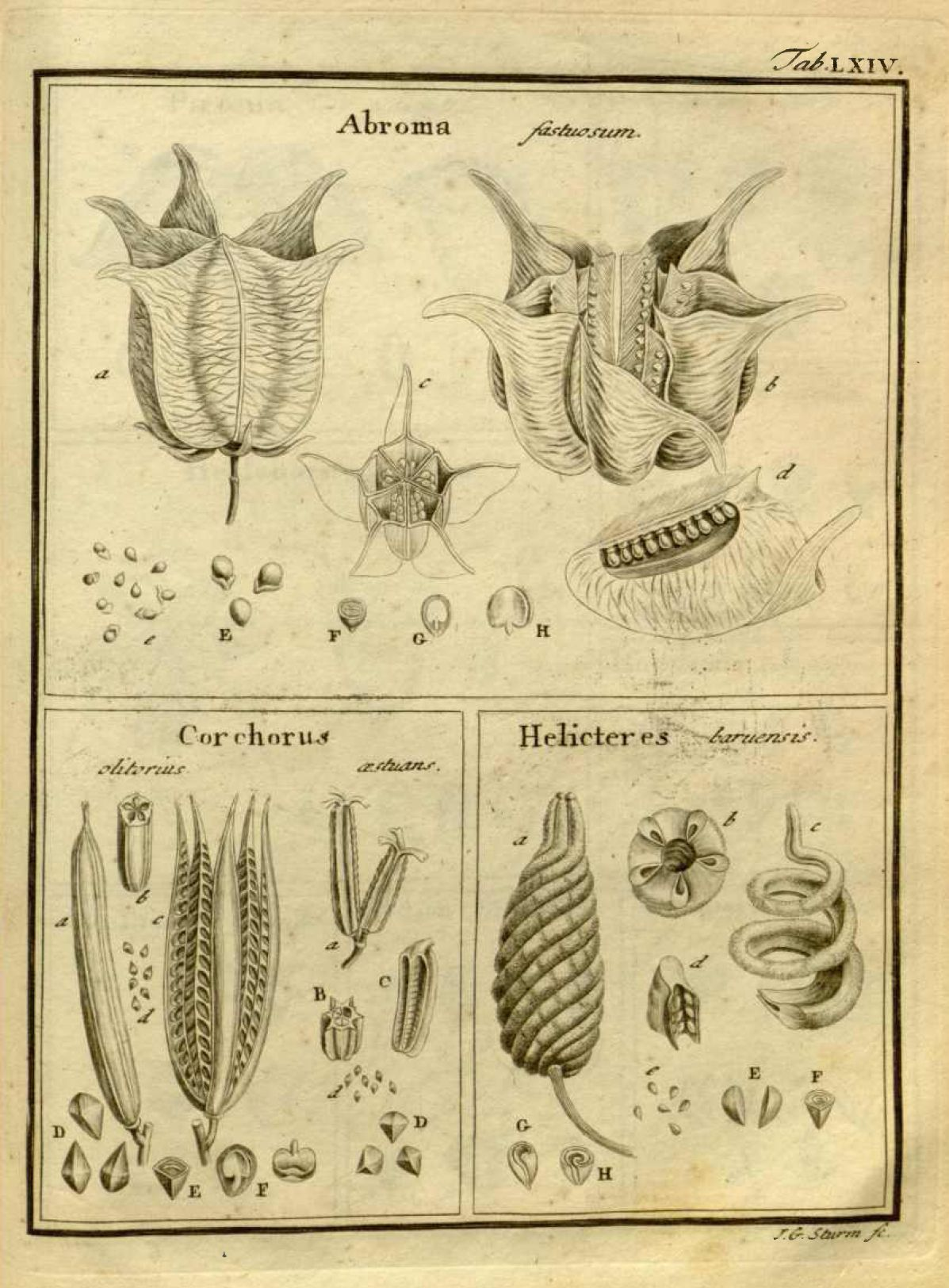
Plate from De Fructibus et Seminibus Plantarum

Johann Georg Sturm (1742–1793) was a German natural history illustrator noted for the plates in Joseph Gaertner's De Fructibus et Seminibus Plantarum, and for co-authoring Deutschlands Flora in Abbildungen. He was the father of Jacob Sturm (1771–1848), a noted entomologist, who engraved the illustrations for the supplement to De Fructibus et Seminibus Plantarum.
