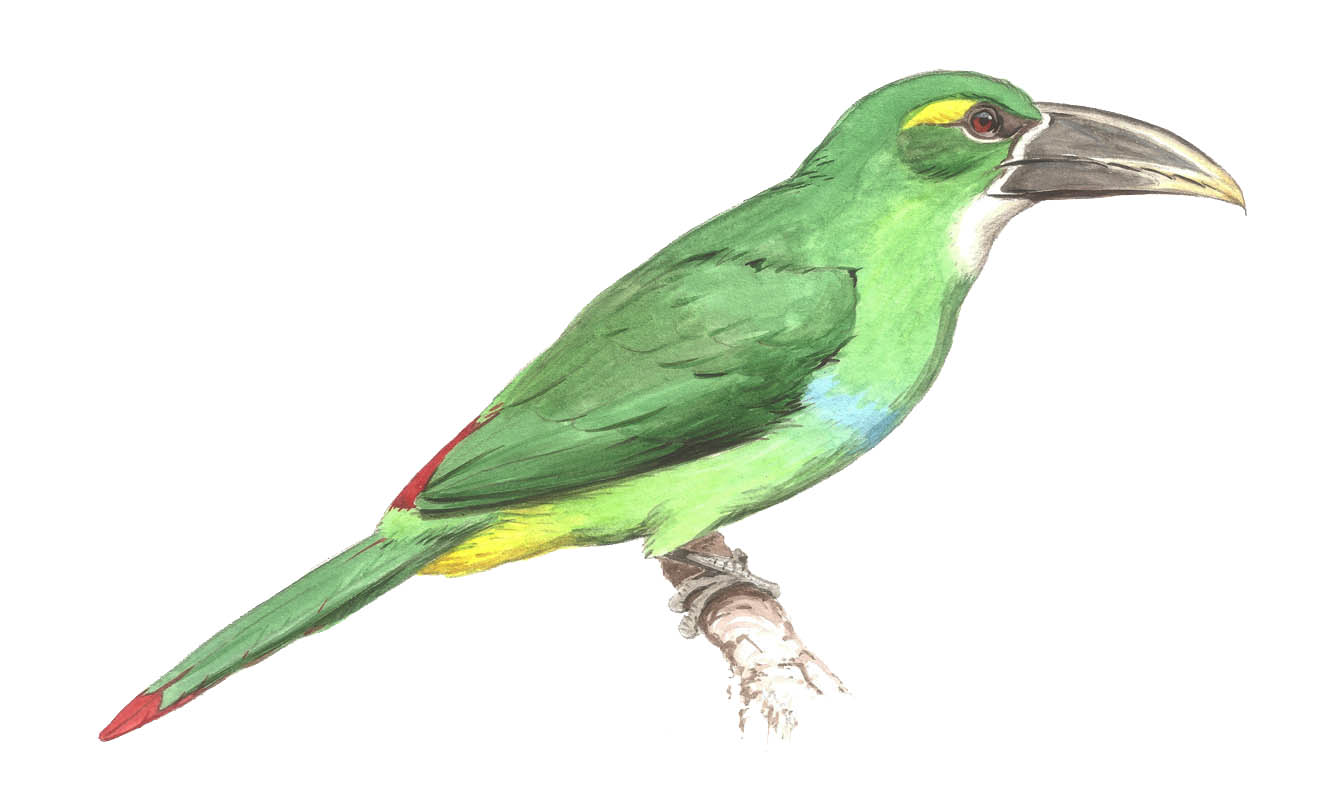

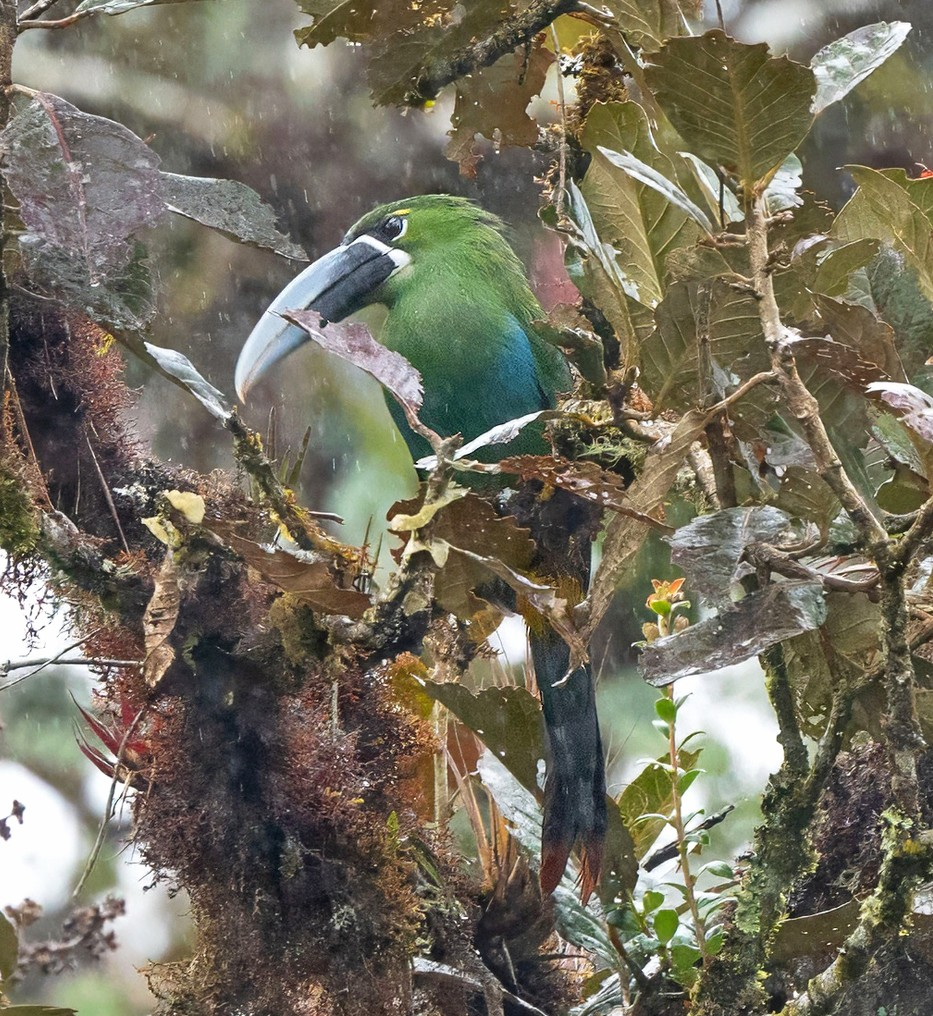

Conservation status
- Near Threatened (IUCN 3.1)

Scientific classification
- Kingdom: Animalia
- Phylum: Chordata
- Class: Aves
- Order: Piciformes
- Family: Ramphastidae
- Genus: Aulacorhynchus
- Species: A. huallagae

Binomial name
- Aulacorhynchus huallagae Carriker, 1933
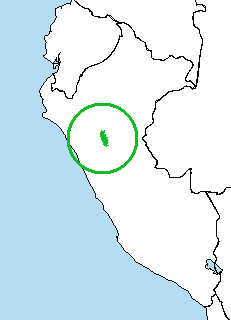
- Range of A. huallagae in Peru

= Yellow-browed toucanet =

Species of bird

The yellow-browed toucanet (Aulacorhynchus huallagae) is an Near-threatened species of bird in the toucan family Ramphastidae. It is endemic to Peru.

== Taxonomy and systematics ==
The yellow-browed toucanet is monotypic.

== Description ==
The yellow-browed toucanet is 38 to 44 cm (15 to 17 in) long and weighs about 250 to 280 g (8.8 to 9.9 oz). The sexes are alike. Their bill is mostly bluish gray with a whitish gray tip and a bright white band at the base. They are mostly yellowish green above with a purer green crown. The face and sides of the neck are apple green with a short narrow yellow supercilium and bare black skin around the reddish eye. Their throat is whitish that becomes greener to a bright blue band across the lower breast. Their belly and flanks are yellowish green and their undertail coverts are golden yellow. Their tail's upper surface is green with a blue wash on the central pair of feathers; the innermost two pairs have chestnut tips. The tail's underside is dusky bluish.

== Distribution and habitat ==
The yellow-browed toucanet has a very small documented range on the east slope of the northern Andes of Peru. It is known from only one location in southern Amazonas Department, two in San Martín Department, and one in northeastern La Libertad Department. It probably occurs between them and possibly further north and south as well, but because the area is roadless opportunities for discovery are limited. It inhabits humid montane forest between elevations of 2,000 and 2,600 m (6,600 and 8,500 ft).

== Behavior ==
=== Feeding ===
The yellow-browed toucanet forages mostly in the canopy. It is known to feed on fruit but details of its diet are lacking.

=== Breeding ===
Essentially nothing is known about the yellow-browed toucanet's breeding biology. Its nesting season appears to span from October to February or March and it is assumed to nest in tree cavities like others of its genus.

=== Vocalization ===
The yellow-browed toucanet's typical call has been described as "a series of 20 to 30 frog-like krik notes" and also as "a series of harsh grunts: rehh rehh rehh...."

== Status ==
The IUCN originally assessed the yellow-browed toucanet as Threatened but since 2000 has treated it as Endangered. The main threat is conversion of its habitat to coca farming, though most of the region's deforestation has occurred at lower elevations. "[T]he human population within its range was higher in the past than at present." It is probably the least-known member of its family and "there is every reason to expect that it will prove to be more continuously distributed [than currently known]. Vulnerable or even Near Threatened might be a more realistic assessment". Since 2022 IUCN assessment has changed from Endangered to Near-Threatened
