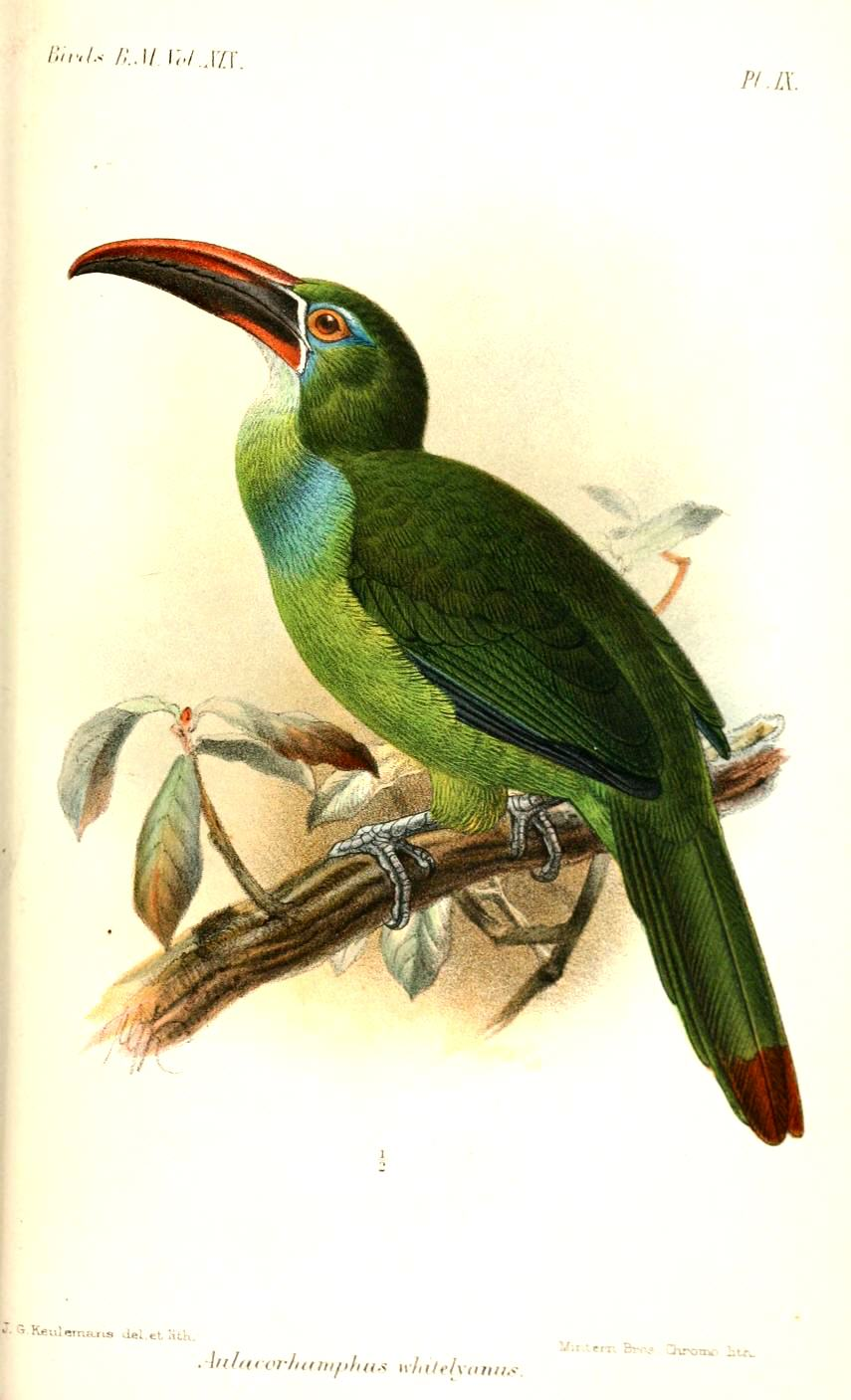

Conservation status
- Least Concern (IUCN 3.1)

Scientific classification
- Kingdom: Animalia
- Phylum: Chordata
- Class: Aves
- Order: Piciformes
- Family: Ramphastidae
- Genus: Aulacorhynchus
- Species: A. whitelianus

Binomial name
- Aulacorhynchus whitelianus Salvin & Godman, 1882

Subspecies
- See text

= Tepui toucanet =

Species of bird

The tepui toucanet or Whitely's toucanet (Aulacorhynchus whitelianus) is a bird in the toucan family Ramphastidae. It is found in Brazil, Guyana, Suriname, and Venezuela.

== Taxonomy and systematics ==
The tepui toucanet and what is now the chestnut-tipped toucanet (A. derbianus) were for a time considered conspecific. They were separated by major taxonomic systems beginning in 2011.

The tepui toucanet has three subspecies:

- A. w. duidae – Chapman, 1929
- The nominate A. w. whitelianus – Salvin & Godman, 1882
- A. w. osgoodi – Blake, 1941

== Description ==
The tepui toucanet is 33 to 41 cm (13 to 16 in) long and weighs 117 to 160 g (4.1 to 5.6 oz). Its bill is deep red and black with a vertical white line at its base and grooves on the maxilla. The sexes are alike. Their plumage is generally green, with a white throat, yellow-green undertail coverts, and some blue beneath the eye. The nominate subspecies has short dull rufous tips on the tail feathers. Subspecies A. w. duidae is larger than the nominate and larger rufous tail tips. A. w. osgoodi is smaller than the nominate, has no rufous on the tail, and has less blue beneath the eye.

== Distribution and habitat ==
The subspecies of tepui toucanet are found thus:

- A. w. duidae, Venezuela's Amazonas and western Bolívar states and adjacent northern Brazil
- A. w. whitelianus, southeastern Bolívar state in southern Venezuela and northwestern Guyana
- A. w. osgoodi, Serra do Acari in southern Guyana and the Wilhelmina Mountains and Tafelberg in Suriname

Undocumented sight records in French Guiana lead the South American Classification Committee of the American Ornithological Society to treat the species as hypothetical in that country.

In southern Venezuela and nearby Brazil the tepui toucanet inhabits moist subtropical montane cloudforest on tepuis. In eastern Venezuela and the Guianas it inhabits hilly tropical forest. In elevation it typically occurs between 800 and 1,800 m (2,600 and 5,900 ft). However, it has been recorded at 2,380 m (7,810 ft) on Venezuela's Cerro Roraima and as low as 380 m (1,250 ft) in Guyana and 640 m (2,100 ft) in Suriname.

== Behavior ==
=== Movement ===
The tepui toucanet is thought to be generally sedentary but is suspected to make seasonal elevational movements in the tepuis of Venezuela.

=== Feeding ===
The tepui toucanet is believed to forage between the forest's lower levels and the subcanopy. Its diet is essentially unknown but is assumed to be similar to the fruit and insects of the chestnut-tipped toucanet. It is mostly seen singly or in pairs but is known to join mixed-species foraging flocks.

=== Breeding ===
The tepui toucanet's breeding season appears to be from February to July. Nothing else is known about its breeding biology.

=== Vocalization ===
The tepui toucanet's song is "a low grunting 'grank, graank, graank...'".

== Status ==
The IUCN has assessed the tepui toucanet as being of Least Concern, though its population size is not known and is believed to be decreasing. No immediate threats have been identified. It is "[s]till common in some Venezuelan localities" and occurs in at least two protected areas in that country. "Information [is] urgently needed on subspecies osgoodi [which is] potentially threatened, in [its] small Guyana-Surinam range."
