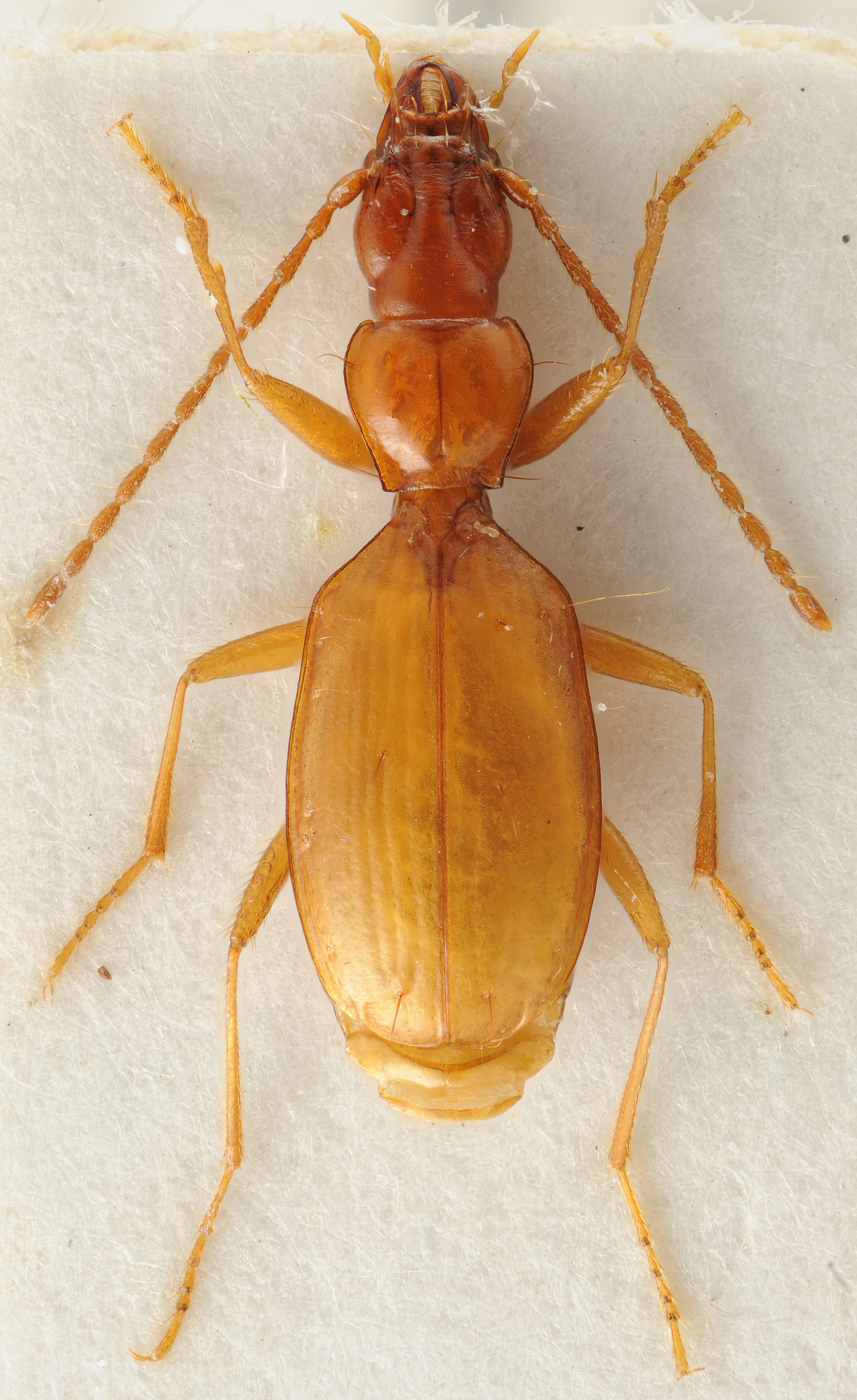
- Anophthalmus hitleri

Scientific classification
- Domain: Eukaryota
- Kingdom: Animalia
- Phylum: Arthropoda
- Class: Insecta
- Order: Coleoptera
- Suborder: Adephaga
- Family: Carabidae
- Subfamily: Trechinae
- Genus: Anophthalmus; Sturm, 1844

= Anophthalmus =

Genus of beetles

Anophthalmus, from Ancient Greek ἀν- (an-), meaning "lack", and ὀφθαλμός (ophthalmós), meaning "eye", is a genus of ground beetle, endemic to Europe.

== Species ==
These 51 species belong to the genus Anophthalmus:

- Anophthalmus aidovskanus (Ganglbauer, 1913) (Slovenia, Croatia)
- Anophthalmus alphonsi (G.Müller, 1914) (Slovenia)
- Anophthalmus amplus Joseph, 1871 (Slovenia)
- Anophthalmus annamariae Bognolo, 2002 (Slovenia)
- Anophthalmus baratellii Sciaky, 1985 (Italy)
- Anophthalmus bernhaueri Ganglbauer, 1895 (Austria, Slovenia)
- Anophthalmus besnicensis Pretner, 1949 (Slovenia)
- Anophthalmus bognoloi Kofler, 2010 (Slovenia)
- Anophthalmus bohiniensis (Ganglbauer, 1903) (Italy, Slovenia)
- Anophthalmus bojani Daffner, 1998 (Slovenia)
- Anophthalmus bukoveci Pretner, 1949 (Slovenia)
- Anophthalmus capillatus Joseph, 1871 (Slovenia)
- Anophthalmus daffneri Broder, 1994 (Slovenia)
- Anophthalmus driolii Bognolo & M.Etonti, 1996 (Slovenia)
- Anophthalmus egonis (G.Müller, 1923) (Slovenia)
- Anophthalmus erebus (Krauss, 1906) (Slovenia)
- Anophthalmus fabbrii G.Müller, 1931 (Italy, Slovenia)
- Anophthalmus fallaciosus (G.Müller, 1914) (Slovenia)
- Anophthalmus gobanzi (Ganglbauer, 1911) (Austria, Slovenia)
- Anophthalmus gridellii G.Müller, 1931 (Italy, Slovenia)
- Anophthalmus haraldianus Daffner, 1992 (Italy)
- Anophthalmus hauckei P.Moravec & Lompe, 2003 (Slovenia)
- Anophthalmus heteromorphus (G.Müller, 1923) (Slovenia)
- Anophthalmus hirtus Sturm, 1853 (Slovenia)
- Anophthalmus hitleri Scheibel, 1937 (Slovenia)
- Anophthalmus jalzici Daffner, 1996 (Croatia)
- Anophthalmus kahleni Daffner, 1998 (Italy, Slovenia)
- Anophthalmus kaufmanni (Ganglbauer, 1900) (Slovenia, Croatia)
- Anophthalmus kertecsi Csiki, 1912 (Slovenia, Croatia)
- Anophthalmus kofleri Daffner, 1996 (Slovenia)
- Anophthalmus leander Sciaky et al, 1999 (Italy, Slovenia)
- Anophthalmus maderi (Winkler, 1914) (Croatia)
- Anophthalmus manhartensis Meschnigg, 1943 (Italy, Slovenia)
- Anophthalmus mayeri (G.Müller, 1909) (Italy, Slovenia)
- Anophthalmus meggiolaroi P.Moravec & Lompe, 2003 (Italy)
- Anophthalmus micklitzi (Ganglbauer, 1913) (Slovenia)
- Anophthalmus miroslavae Kofler, 2006 (Slovenia)
- Anophthalmus nivalis (G.Müller, 1922) (Italy, Slovenia)
- Anophthalmus paciuchensis Monguzzi, 1995 (Italy)
- Anophthalmus pretneri (G.Müller, 1913) (Austria, Slovenia)
- Anophthalmus ravasinii (G.Müller, 1922) (Slovenia)
- Anophthalmus sanctaeluciae G.Müller, 1931 (Slovenia)
- Anophthalmus schatzmayri P.Moravec, 2003 (Austria, Italy, Slovenia)
- Anophthalmus schaumii Schaum, 1860 (Slovenia, Croatia)
- Anophthalmus schmidti Sturm, 1844 (Italy, Slovenia, Croatia)
- Anophthalmus scopolii F.J.Schmidt, 1850 (Italy, Slovenia, Croatia)
- Anophthalmus seppenhoferi Bognolo, 1997 (Italy)
- Anophthalmus severi (Ganglbauer, 1897) (Slovenia)
- Anophthalmus spectabilis Joseph, 1871 (Slovenia)
- Anophthalmus tolminensis (G.Müller, 1922) (Slovenia)
- Anophthalmus winklerianus Jeannel, 1926 (Croatia)
