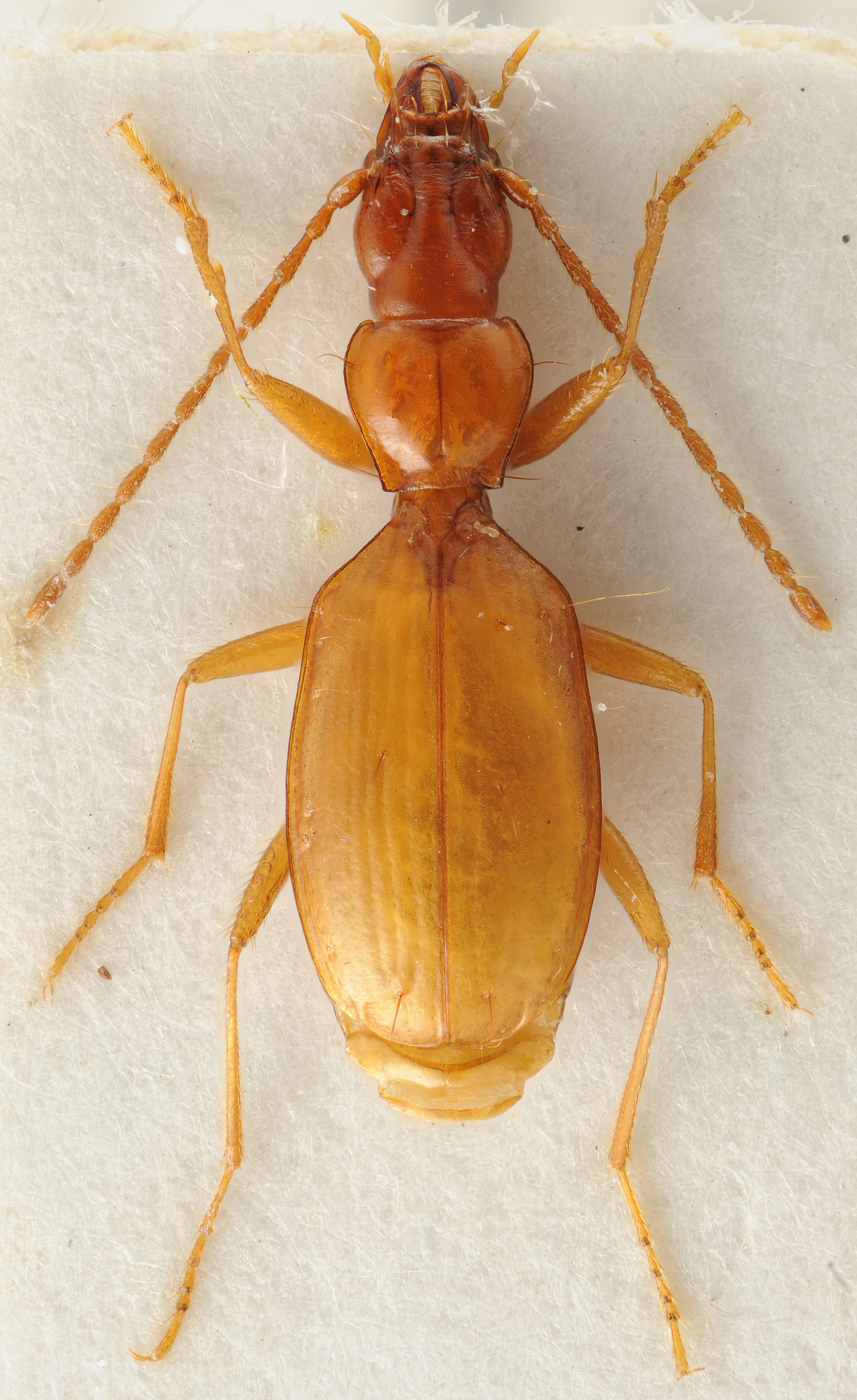

Scientific classification
- Kingdom: Animalia
- Phylum: Arthropoda
- Clade: Pancrustacea
- Class: Insecta
- Order: Coleoptera
- Suborder: Adephaga
- Family: Carabidae
- Genus: Anophthalmus
- Species: A. hitleri

Binomial name
- Anophthalmus hitleri Scheibel, 1937

= Anophthalmus hitleri =

Species of beetle

Anophthalmus hitleri (Slovene: Hitlerjev brezokec) is a species of blind cave beetle found only in about fifteen humid caves in Slovenia. The blind cave beetle shares its genus with 41 other species and 95 different subspecies. Members of its subfamily (Trechinae) are, like most Carabidae, predatory, so the adults and larvae of A. hitleri are presumed to be predators on smaller cave inhabitants.

== Name ==
The scientific name of the beetle comes from an Austrian collector, Oskar Scheibel, who sold a specimen of a then-undocumented species in 1933. Its species name was made a dedication to Adolf Hitler, who had recently become Chancellor of Germany. The dedication did not go unnoticed by Hitler, who sent Scheibel a letter showing his gratitude. The genus name comes from Ancient Greek ἀν- an- "lacking, without" and ὀφθαλμός ophthalmós "eye".

The species exhibits no notable characteristics, such as extravagant colors or unusual antennae, but is of interest to beetle collectors (and also collectors of Hitler memorabilia) as a result of its name. Some have claimed that this is putting the beetle in danger of extinction, but others believe this claim greatly exaggerates the actual threat posed by collecting.

While many have suggested the species be renamed, the International Code of Zoological Nomenclature's principle of priority holds that the first name validly published for a species is its correct name, and while the ICZN strongly discourages authors from publishing names that could be considered offensive, this does not in general allow for an offensive name to be invalidated once it has been published. On the topic of A. hitleri's name, International Commission on Zoological Nomenclature (ICZN) President Thomas Pape says: "It was not offensive when it was proposed, and it may not be offensive 100 years from now." One potential solution suggested by the vice-president of the ICZN, Patrice Bouchard, was to "change the vernacular name", and in September 2023, a new vernacular name, Slovenian blind cave beetle, was proposed.

== See also ==
- List of organisms named after famous people (born 1800–1899)
