= Jacob Sturm =

German entomologist and botanist (1771–1848)

- Born: Jacob Sturm; 21 March 1771
- Died: 28 November 1848 (aged 77)

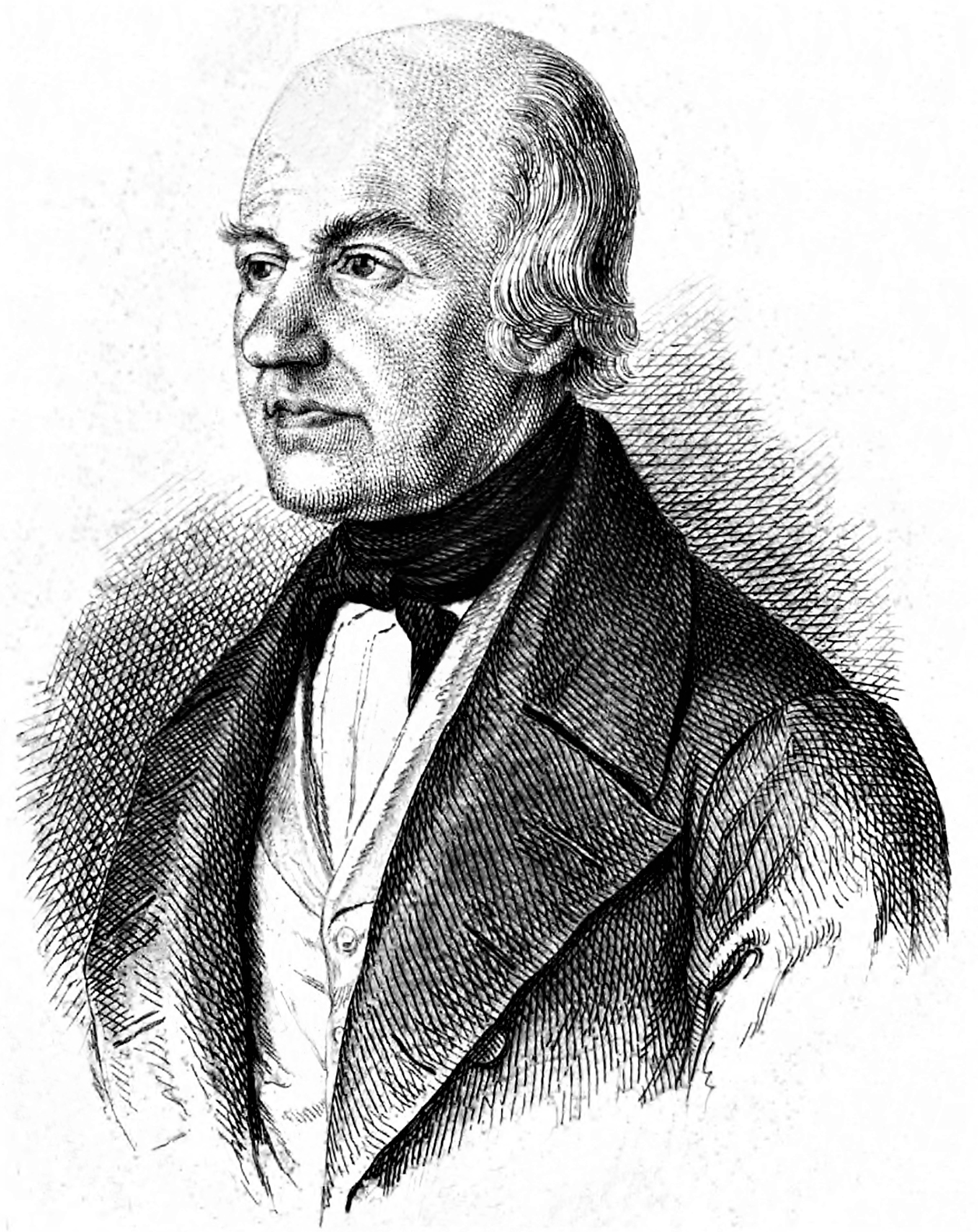
Jacob Sturm

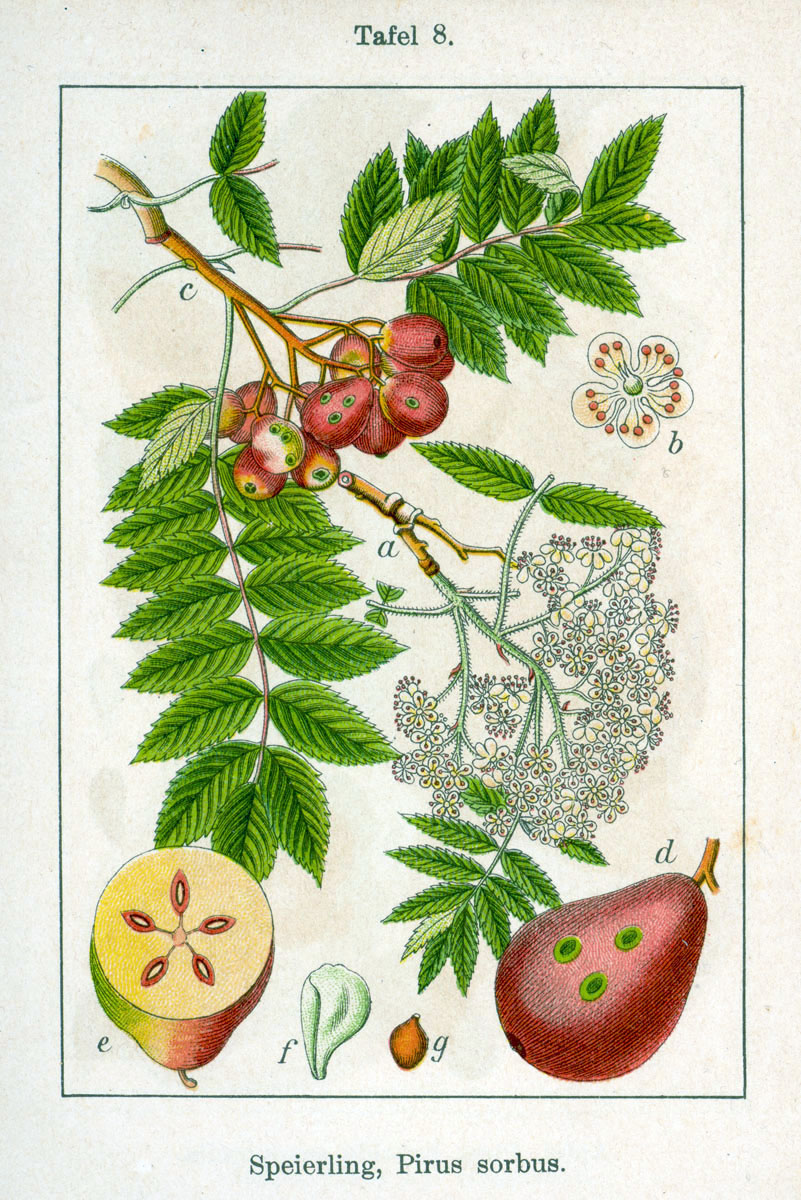
Service tree in Deutschlands Flora in Abbildungen

Jacob Sturm (21 March 1771 – 28 November 1848) was a leading engraver of entomological and botanical scientific publications in Germany at the end of the 18th and beginning of the 19th century. He was born and lived in Nuremberg and was the only son of engraver Johann Georg Sturm (1742-1793), who trained him in drawing and copperplate engraving.

Sturm became a celebrated insect collector and founded the Nuremberg Society for Natural History. His entomological and botanical plates are very accurately drawn, show minute details, and enjoyed a great popularity among naturalists. As most of his works were published in a small format, they could be purchased by a larger public and they were very popular. During this period, Nuremberg was the centre of natural history book production in Germany.

"The book Deutschlands Flora, 1798–1862. 163 parts (in 136 volumes) contains... neat and attractive little engravings, no more than 5 in. by 3½ inches in size... He thus deliberately chose this minute format in order to make a knowledge of the German flora available by pictures to as many as possible and as cheaply as possible. Despite their smallness, they carry a surprising amount of detail. Jacob Sturm learnt his art from his father, Johann Georg Sturm, who was also a Nuremberg engraver" (Blunt & Stearn pp. 258–260). His sons Johann Heinrich Christian Friedrich Sturm and Johann Wilhelm Sturm also contributed to his works.

== Some works illustrated by Jacob Sturm ==
- la Deutschlands Flora in Abbildungen nach der Natur mit Beschreibungen (de 1796 à 1862) avec 2 472 gravures illustrant des textes de Johann Christian Daniel von Schreber, David Heinrich Hoppe, Heinrich Gottlieb Ludwig Reichenbach (1793–1879) et d’autres;
- la traduction en allemand de l’Entomologie de Guillaume-Antoine Olivier (1756–1814) par Johann Karl Wilhelm Illiger (1775–1813), Abbildungen zu Karl Illigers Uebersetzung von Oliviers Entomologie (1802–1803, Nuremberg);
- Beschreibung der Gräser nebst ihren Abbildungen nach der Natur de J.C.D. von Schreber (1766–1779, Leipzig);
- Deutschlands Insectenfaune et Kritische Revision der Insectenfaune Deutschlands... de Georg Wolfgang Franz Panzer (Nuremberg, 1805–1806);
- Catalecta Botanica quibus Plantae Novae et Minus Cognitae Describuntur atque Illustrantur d’Albrecht Wilhelm Roth (1757–1834) (trois volumes, Leipzig, 1797–1806);
- Versuch einer geognostisch-botanischen Darstellung der Flora der Vorwelt (Leipzig, 1820–1838) et Revisio Saxifragarum Iconibus Illustrata (Regensberg, 1810–1822, Leipzig, 1831) du comte Kaspar Maria von Sternberg;
- System der Pilze und Schwämme (Wurbzerg, 1816) et Bryologia Germanica, oder Beschreibung der in Deutschland und in der Schweiz wachsenden Laubmoose (Nuremberg, 1823–1831) de Christian Gottfried Daniel Nees von Esenbeck;
- Caricologia Germanica, oder Beschreybungen und Abbildungen aller in Deutschland wildwachsenden Seggen (Nüremberg, 1835) de D.H. Hoppe.
