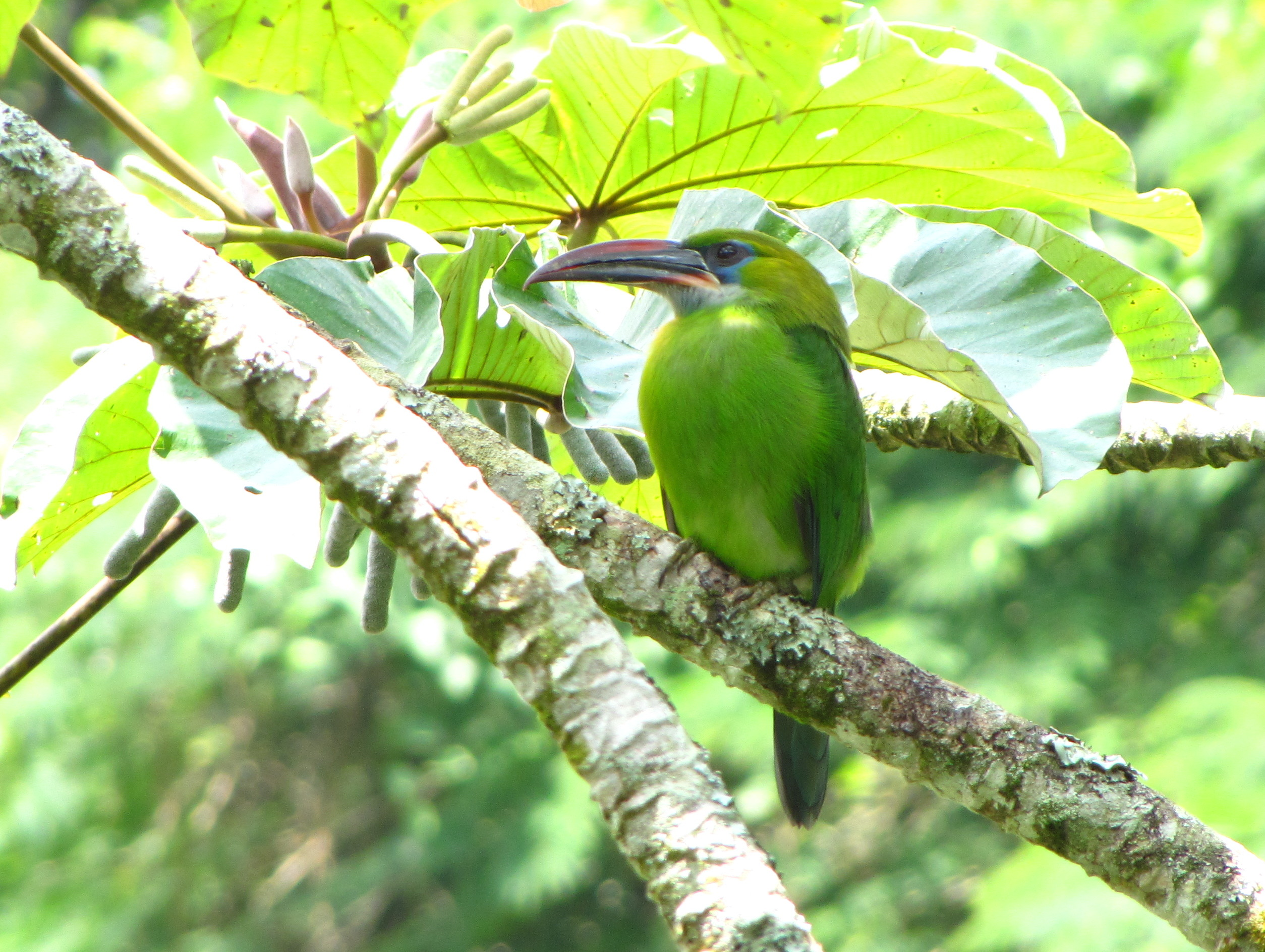
- In Henri Pittier National Park, Aragua State, Venezuela

Conservation status
- Least Concern (IUCN 3.1)

Scientific classification
- Kingdom: Animalia
- Phylum: Chordata
- Class: Aves
- Order: Piciformes
- Family: Ramphastidae
- Genus: Aulacorhynchus
- Species: A. sulcatus

Binomial name
- Aulacorhynchus sulcatus (Swainson, 1820)

Subspecies
- See text

Synonyms
- Pteroglossus sulcatus

= Groove-billed toucanet =

Species of bird

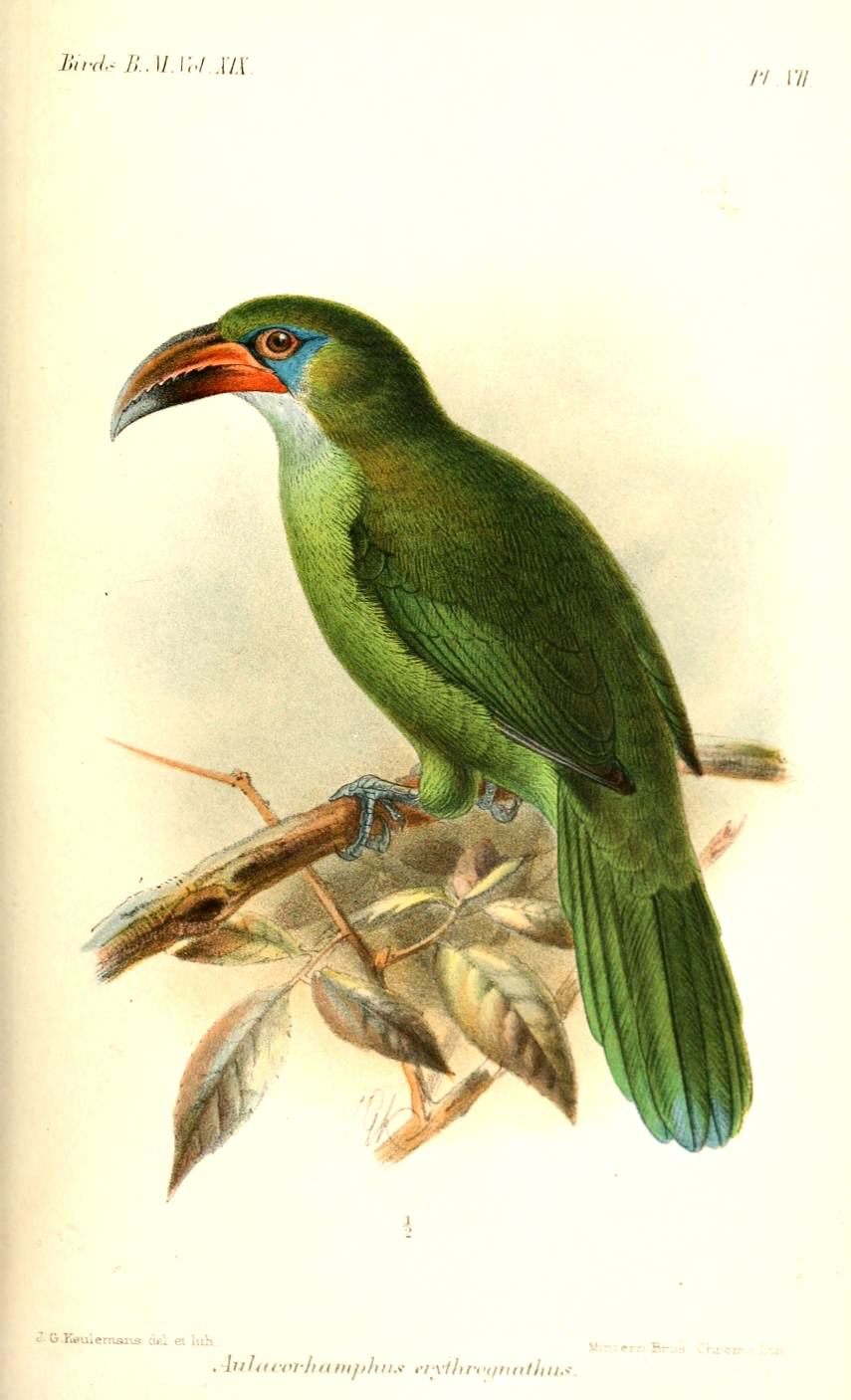
Subspecies A. s. erythrognathus, illustration by Keulemans, 1891

The groove-billed toucanet (Aulacorhynchus sulcatus) is a bird in the toucan family Ramphastidae. It is found in Colombia and Venezuela.

== Taxonomy and systematics ==
The groove-billed toucanet was originally described in the genus Pteroglossus. The International Ornithological Committee (IOC), the South American Classification Committee of the American Ornithological Society, and the Clements taxonomy recognize these three subspecies:

- The nominate A. s. sulcatus – (Swainson, 1820)
- A. s. erythrognathus – Gould, 1874
- A. s. calorhynchus – Gould, 1874

A. s. calorhynchus was formerly treated as a separate species, "yellow-billed toucanet", by most taxonomists but was merged into the groove-billed toucanet starting in 2012. BirdLife International's Handbook of the Birds of the World retains it as a species.

Subspecies A. s. erythrognathus might warrant consideration as a separate species because its voice is different from that of the other two subspecies.

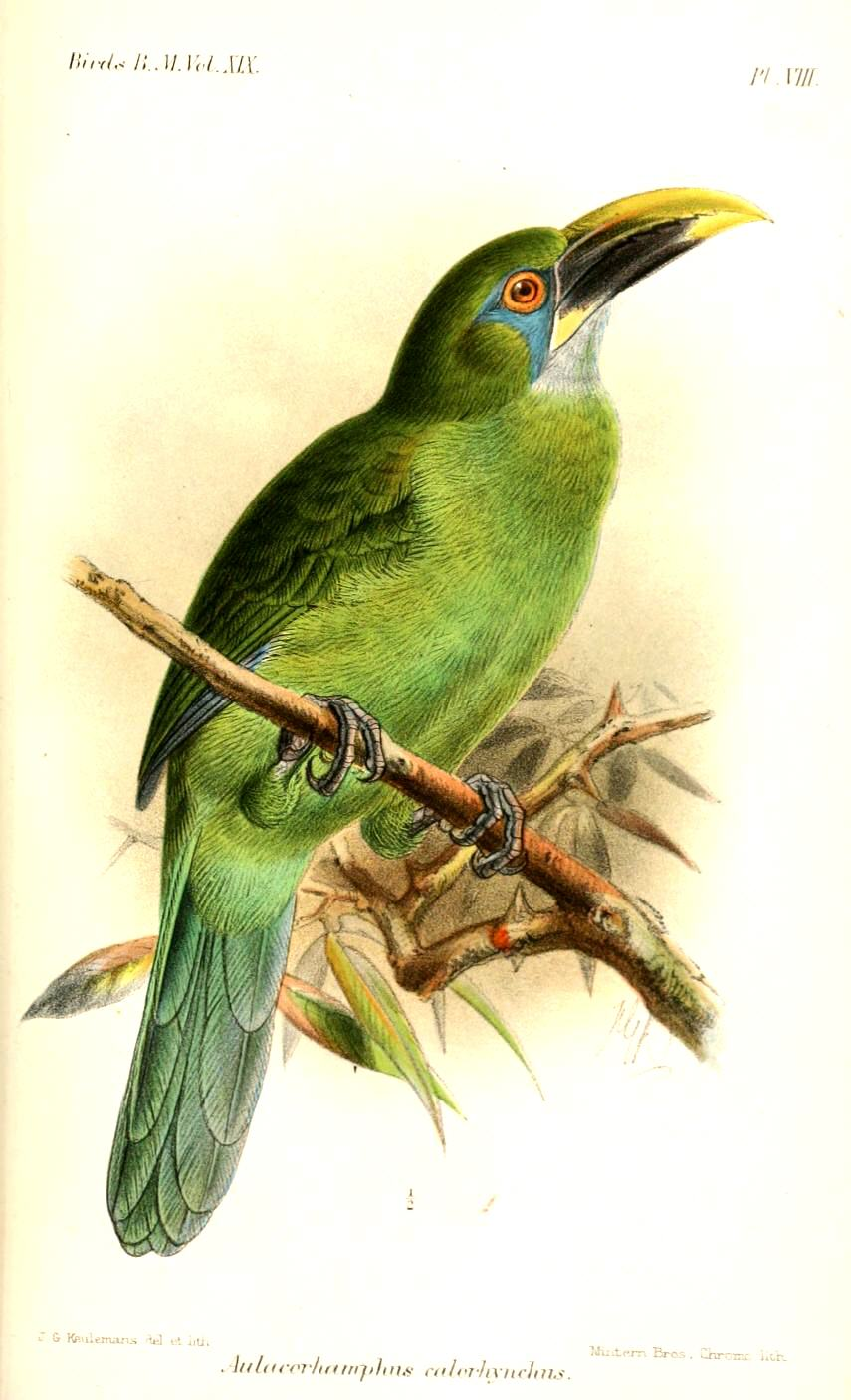
"Yellow-billed" toucanet, illustration by Keulemans, 1891

== Description ==
The groove-billed toucanet is 33 to 37 cm (13 to 15 in) long and weighs 130 to 200 g (4.6 to 7.1 oz). Its grooved culmen and mandible give it its English name. In the nominate subspecies and A. s. erythrognathus, most of the bill is wine-red to brown-red with a diagonal black stripe on the mandible. The nominate's bill also has a vertical white stripe at its base. In A. s. calorhynchus the bill is mostly yellow with a reduced amount of black, some orange-red at the base of the mandible, and a white stripe like the nominate's. All subspecies are overall mostly green, with the underparts being lighter and the undertail coverts yellower. The nominate subspecies has a white throat, some gold-bronze on the face, and bare blue skin around the brownish eye. A. s. erythrognathus has essentially the same plumage but with less gold-bronze on the face. A. s. calorhynchus also has similar plumage to the nominate but is larger than it and A. s. erythrognathus.

== Distribution and habitat ==
The subspecies of groove-billed toucanet are found thus:

- A. s. sulcatus, northern Venezuela between Falcón and Miranda states
- A. s. erythrognathus, mountains of northeastern Venezuela
- A. s. calorhynchus, Sierra Nevada de Santa Marta and Serranía del Perijá in northeastern Colombia and eastward to Lara in northwestern Venezuela

The species primarily inhabits humid montane forest but is also found in semi-open landscapes like secondary forest, forest edges and nearby isolated trees, and gardens. It shuns large open areas. In elevation it mostly ranges between 900 and 2,000 m (3,000 and 6,600 ft) but occurs as low as sea level and as high as about 2,400 m (7,900 ft).

== Behavior ==
=== Movement ===
The groove-billed toucanet is generally non-migratory but occasionally moves to lower parts of its elevational range in the rainy season.

=== Feeding ===
The groove-billed toucanet forages at all levels of its habitat, sometimes in groups. It has been observed following army ant swarms. Its diet is not known in detail but the species is omnivorous, eating fruit, invertebrates, eggs, and small vertebrates.

=== Breeding ===
Little is known about the groove-billed toucanet's breeding biology. Its season appears to be March to July in parts of its range but extends to August in northeastern Venezuela. In other parts of Venezuela it may nest as early as February and as late as October. It is believed to nest in tree cavities, either natural or those abandoned by woodpeckers. The nest, eggs, incubation period, and time to fledging are not known.

=== Vocalization ===
The groove-billed toucanet's song is "barking-growling notes or croaks...wik-wik- to waak-waak-", sometimes sung in duet. Male's voices are lower pitched than female's. A. s. erythrognathus' song sounds similar to those of the other subspecies but is apparently faster.

== Status ==
The IUCN has assessed the groove-billed toucanet as being of Least Concern, though its population size is not known and is believed to be decreasing. No immediate threats have been identified. "Biological and further ecological data [are] required in case any of the subspecies should eventually need to be monitored."
