= Johann Heinrich Christian Friedrich Sturm =

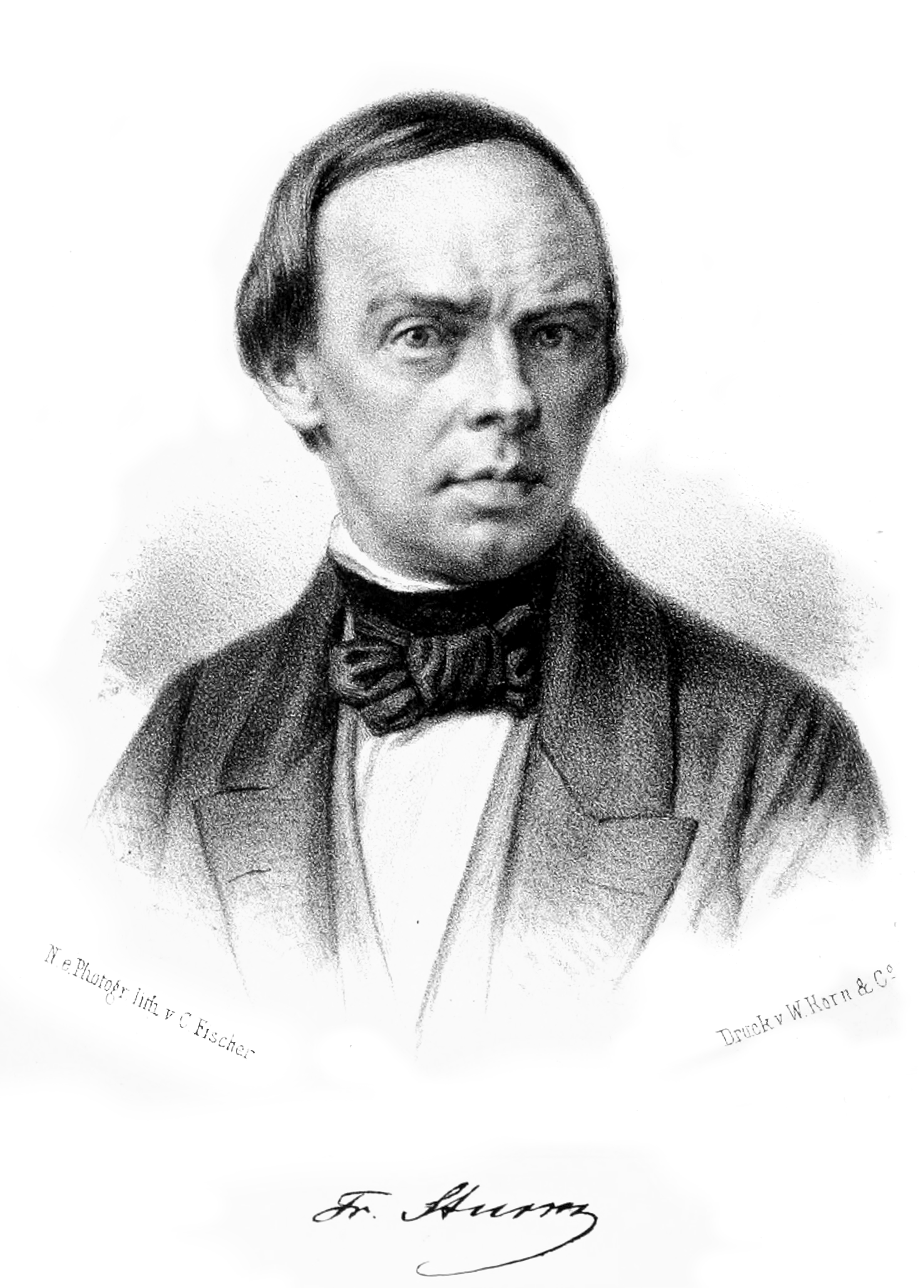

Johann Heinrich Christian Friedrich Sturm (6 February 1805 – 24 January 1862) was a German ornithologist and engraver. He was the son of Jacob Sturm and brother of Johann Wilhelm Sturm.

== Biography ==
Sturm was born in Nürnberg, the eldest son of copperplate engraver Jacob Sturm and his wife Christine Albertine Wilhelmine née Wagner. He studied from 1820 to 1828 at the Nürnberg art school specializing in portraiture. His younger brother Johann Wilhelm Sturm took an interest in botany and together they helped their father in the production of books on German flora and fauna. In 1837 he married Anna Margaretha Luise née Zwinger. His plates went into several ornithological works. He received an honorary doctoral degree in 1848 from the Gettysburg College in Pennsylvania. granted him the honoris causa doctoral degree.
