= Johann Wilhelm Sturm =

German botanist

- Born: 19 July 1808; Nuremberg
- Died: 7 January 1865 (aged 56); Nuremberg, Bavaria
- Scientific career
- Fields: Botany, Ornithology, Entomology
- Author abbrev. (botany): J.W.Sturm

Johann Wilhelm Sturm (19 July 1808 – 7 January 1865) was a German botanist.

The standard author abbreviation J.W.Sturm is used to indicate this person as the author when citing a botanical name.

== Works ==
- With Jacob Sturm - Deutschlands Flora in Abbildungen nach der Natur mit beschreibungen - Nuremberg, 1817
- Nymphaea semiaperta Klinggraff, eine fur Bayern neue pflanze, bei Nurnberg aufgefunden - Abhandlungen der Naturhistorischen Gesellschaft zu Nürnberg, Nuremberg, 1858
- Ophioglosseae, Marattiaceae, Osmundaceae, Schizaeaceae, Gleicheniaceae, Hymeanophylleae - in Flora brasiliensis, Leipzig, 1854
