= Hieracium hieronymi =

Conservation status
- Data Deficient (IUCN 3.1)

Scientific classification
- Kingdom: Plantae
- Clade: Tracheophytes
- Clade: Angiosperms
- Clade: Eudicots
- Clade: Asterids
- Order: Asterales
- Family: Asteraceae
- Genus: Hieracium
- Species: H. hieronymi

Binomial name
- Hieracium hieronymi Zahn
- Hieracium hieronymi distribution

Synonyms
- [Hieracium granatense] Arv.-Touv. & Gaut.

Species of flowering plant

Hieracium hieronymi is a forb of genus Hieracium in the family Asteraceae. and found only in Ecuador once in a collection gathered in 1871 from Pichincha; the description included with the specimen was "Crescit prope Panecillo haud procul a praedio Hacienda Pesillo inter urben Quito et La Esperanza", and in a more recent specimen reported by L. Mille still some years ago (before the Second World War) gathered from Carchi and deposited in the Berlin Herbarium where the taxonomic problems have remained intact.

Carchi and Pichincha Provinces in Ecuador the last known sighting of Hieracium hieronymi.

The natural habitat of Hieracium hieronymi is the subtropical or tropical moist Andean montane grasslands and shrublands between the altitudes of 1,500 m (4,921 ft) to 3,500 m (11,483 ft). It is threatened by habitat loss. It has not been found growing in the protected lands of páramo.
