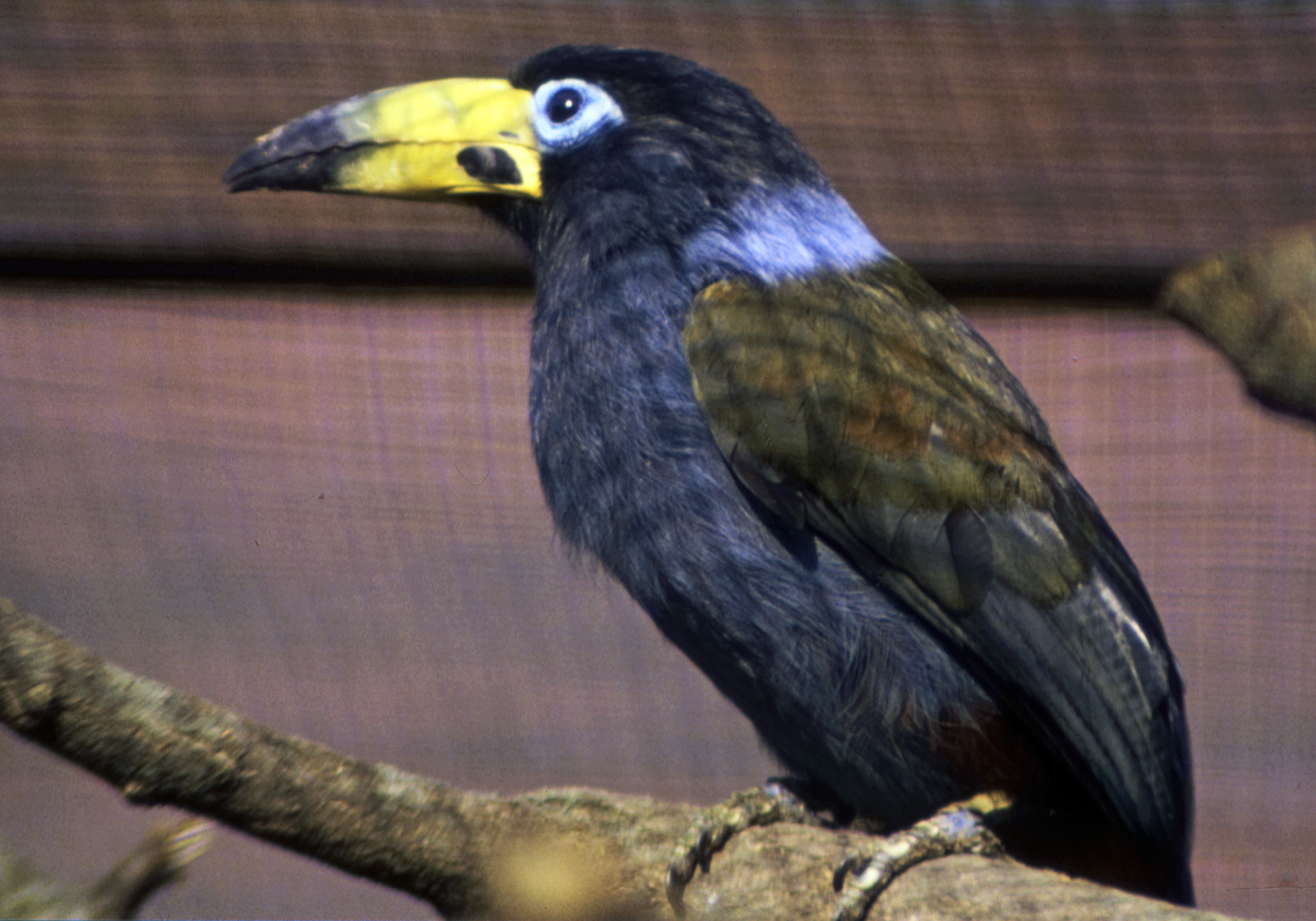
- At Weltvogelpark Walsrode, Lower Saxony, Germany

Conservation status
- Least Concern (IUCN 3.1)

Scientific classification
- Kingdom: Animalia
- Phylum: Chordata
- Class: Aves
- Order: Piciformes
- Family: Ramphastidae
- Genus: Andigena
- Species: A. cucullata

Binomial name
- Andigena cucullata (Gould, 1846)

Synonyms
- Pteroglossus cucullatus

= Hooded mountain toucan =

Species of bird

The hooded mountain toucan (Andigena cucullata) is a species of bird in the toucan family Ramphastidae. It is found in Bolivia and Peru.

== Taxonomy and systematics ==
The hooded mountain toucan was originally described in genus Pteroglossus. It is monotypic.

== Description ==
The hooded mountain toucan is 48 to 50 cm (19 to 20 in) long and weighs 222 to 380 g (7.8 to 13 oz). Males and females have the same plumage and bill pattern though the female's bill is shorter. Their bill is mostly yellow-green, with a black tip and a black spot near the base of the mandible. Their head is dark blue to black with pale blue bare skin around the eye and a gray-blue collar on the hindneck. Their upper back is chestnut becoming green and yellow at the rump. Their tail is blackish and their wings green. Their underparts are mostly sooty blue to blue-gray; their thighs are rusty and their undertail coverts are red.

== Distribution and habitat ==
The hooded mountain toucan is found on the east side of the Andes from southeastern Peru's Department of Puno into western and central Bolivia as far as Cochabamba Department. It inhabits wet temperate and subtropical forest. In elevation it mostly ranges between 2,400 and 3,300 m (7,900 and 10,800 ft) but is known as low as 2,000 m (6,600 ft).

== Behavior ==
=== Movement ===
The hooded mountain toucan is mostly sedentary but individuals wander below the usual lower limit of its range.

=== Feeding ===
The hooded mountain toucan forages from the forest's understorey up to its canopy, singly or in small groups that might be extended families. Its diet is known to include several kinds of fruit but details are lacking.

=== Breeding ===
The hooded mountain toucan's breeding season is thought to be from February to June but perhaps might start as early as November. Essentially nothing else is known about its breeding biology.

=== Vocal and non-vocal sounds ===
The hooded mountain toucan's song is "a slow series of 'peeeeah' notes". Its calls include "ick" or "tik" notes. Songs and calls can include bill-clapping.

== Status ==
The IUCN has assessed the hooded mountain toucan as being of Least Concern. Though it has a limited range and its population size is not known, the latter is believed to be stable. No immediate threats have been identified. "Data on nesting and foraging are needed in order to provide bases for monitoring."
