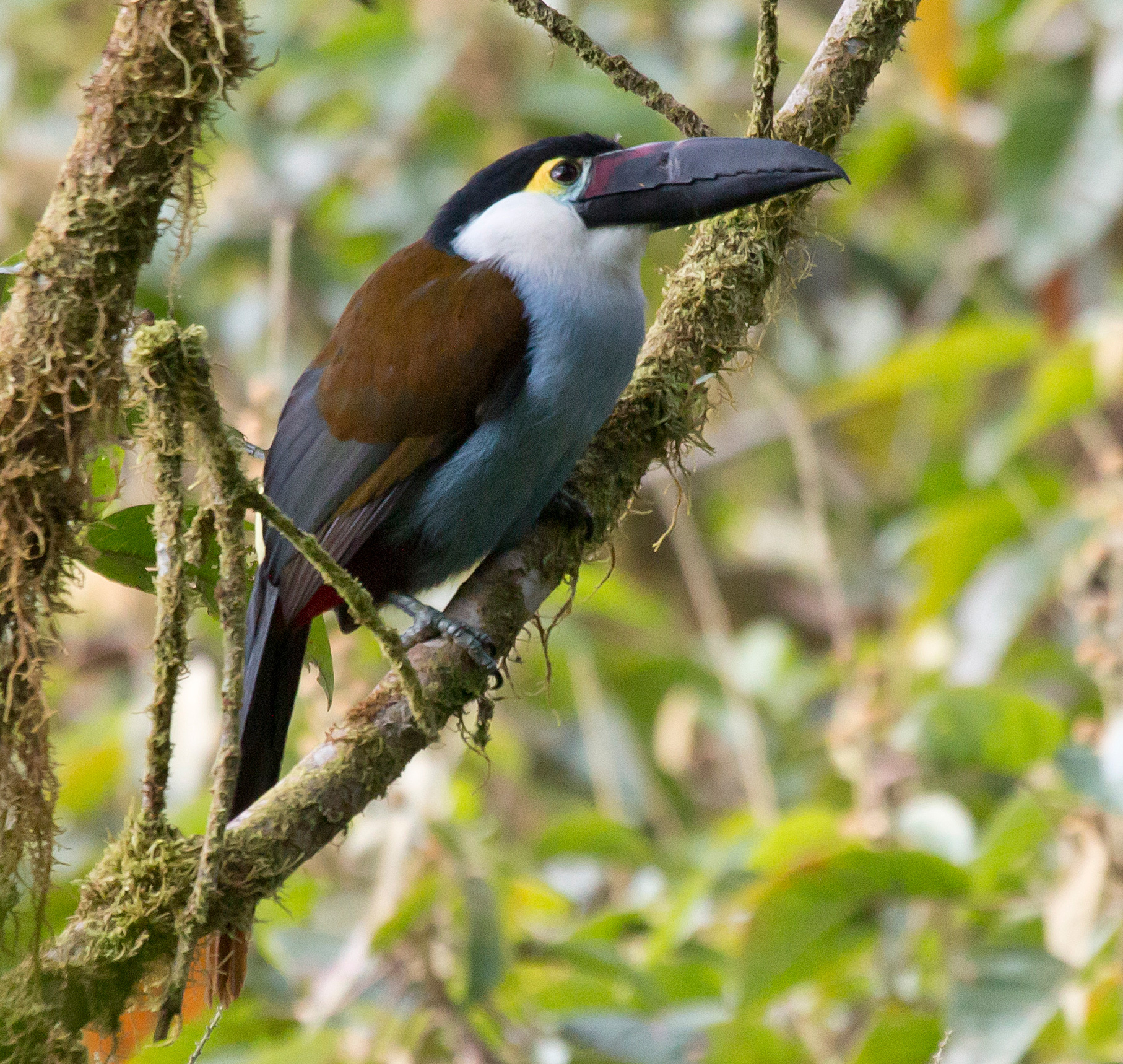

Conservation status
- Least Concern (IUCN 3.1)

Scientific classification
- Kingdom: Animalia
- Phylum: Chordata
- Class: Aves
- Order: Piciformes
- Family: Ramphastidae
- Genus: Andigena
- Species: A. nigrirostris

Binomial name
- Andigena nigrirostris (Waterhouse, 1839)

Subspecies
- See text

Synonyms
- Pteroglossus nigrirostris

= Black-billed mountain toucan =

Species of toucan

The black-billed mountain toucan (Andigena nigrirostris) is a species of bird in the toucan family Ramphastidae. It is found in Colombia, Ecuador, Peru, and Venezuela.

== Taxonomy and systematics ==
The black-billed mountain toucan was originally described in genus Pteroglossus. Three subspecies are recognized, the nominate A. n. nigrirostris (Waterhouse, 1839), A. n. occidentalis (Chapman, 1915), and A. n. spilorhynchus (Gould, 1858).

A. n. spilorhynchus was originally described as the species Andigena spilorhynchus.

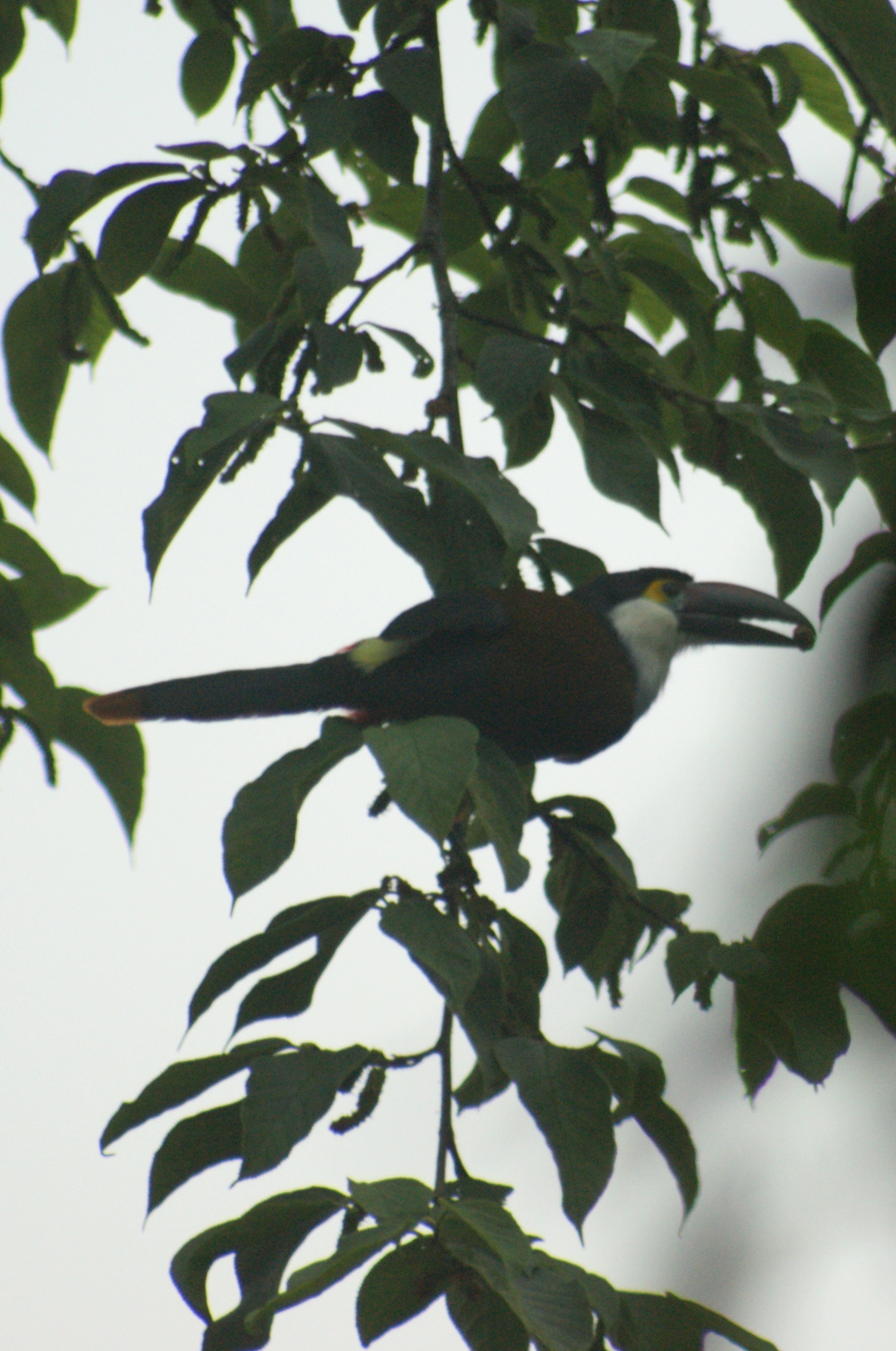
Feeding on fruits in Colombia

== Description ==
The three subspecies of black-billed mountain toucan have almost the same plumage. They have a black cap and nape and bronzy upperparts with a pale yellow rump. Their tail is dark slate with chestnut tips on the central two or three pairs of feathers. Their face and throat are white becoming pale blue on the breast; their thighs are chestnut and their undertail coverts are red. Bare skin surrounds their eye; it is pale blue before it and yellow or orange behind. Subspecies A. n. occidentalis' plumage differs from that of the other two only by having darker chestnut thighs.

Within each subspecies both sexes have the same bill pattern but the female's bill is shorter. The nominate subspecies has an entirely black bill. A. n. spilorhynchus has a mostly black bill with some dark red at the base and on the upper part of the maxilla. A. n. occidentalis has a bill like that of spilorhynchus but the red of the maxilla extends more than half way along the culmen.

== Distribution and habitat ==
The subspecies of black-billed mountain toucan are found thus:

Image	Subspecies	Distribution
	A. n. nigrirostris	the Andes of western Venezuela and the eastern slope of Colombia's Eastern Andes
	A. n. occidentalis	Colombia's Western Andes
	A. n. spilorhynchus	from the Central Andes and western slope of the Eastern Andes of Colombia south through Ecuador on the eastern Andean slope into far northwestern Peru's Department of Piura.

The black-billed mountain toucan inhabits a variety of landscapes including cloudforest, subtropical to temperate montane forest, and more open areas such as croplands near forest and open sites with scattered trees. In elevation it mostly ranges between 1,700 and 2,700 m (5,600 and 8,900 ft) but occurs rarely down to 1,200 m (3,900 ft) and has been found as high as 3,245 m (10,600 ft).

== Behavior ==
=== Movement ===
As far as is known, the black-billed mountain toucan is a year-round resident throughout its range.

=== Feeding ===
The black-billed mountain toucan mostly forages in the forest's canopy, in pairs or in small family groups. Its diet is known to include several kinds of fruit and some insects, but details are lacking.

=== Breeding ===
The black-billed mountain toucan's breeding season is from August to November in Venezuela. It is from March to August in Colombia, and in Ecuador is thought to be the same or earlier. Essentially nothing else is known about its breeding biology.

=== Vocal and non-vocal sounds ===
The black-billed mountain toucan makes "nasal 'gwaaak' notes...variable, notes can be drawn out, or yelp-like". It also makes bill-rattling or clacking that may be combined with the vocalization.

== Status ==
The IUCN originally assessed the black-billed mountain toucan as Near Threatened but since 2004 has rated it as being of Least Concern. It has a large range, but its population size is not known and is believed to be decreasing. Deforestation has left its habitat fragmented in most of its range, leading to the species' being found locally rather than continuously.
