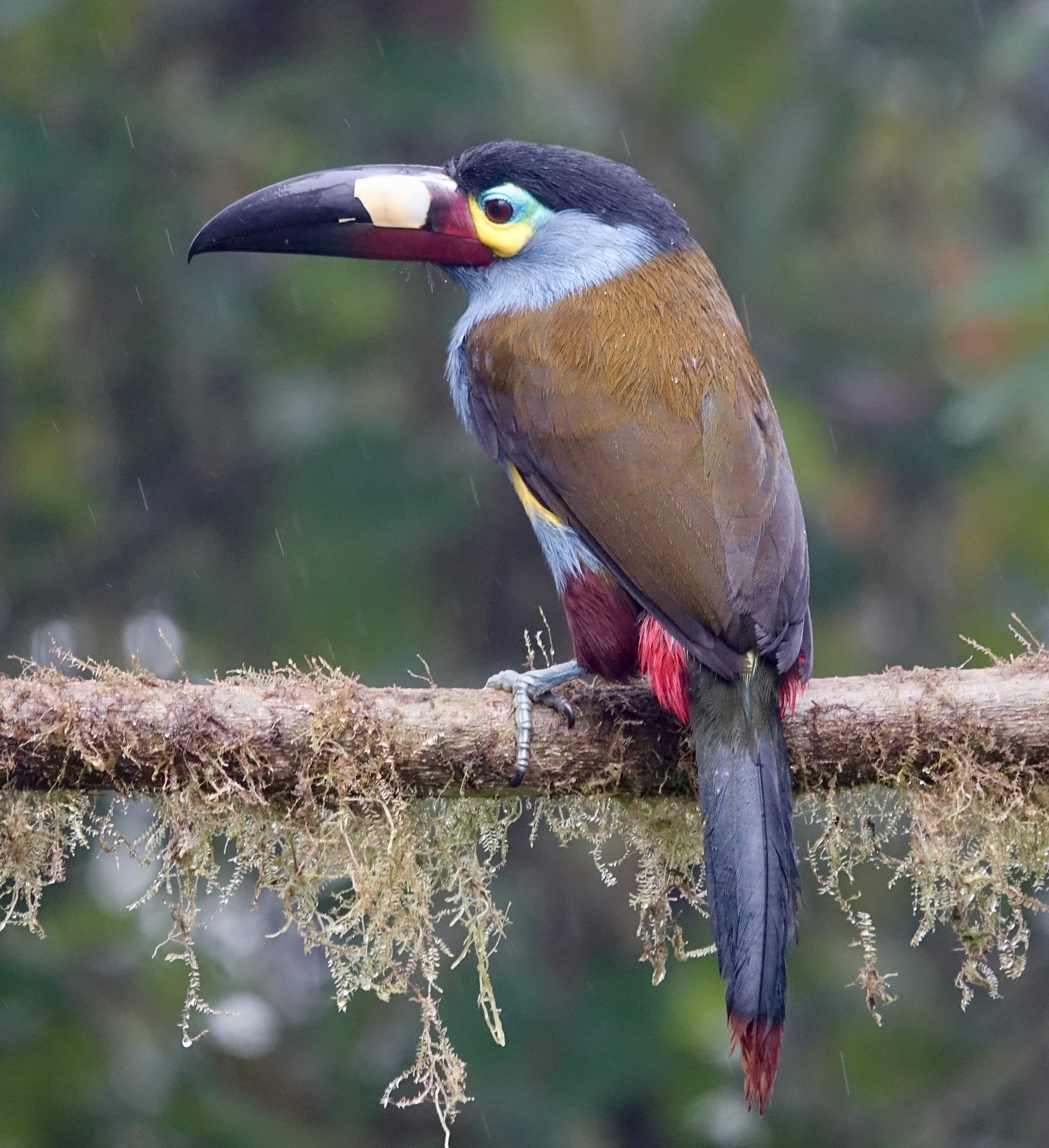
- In northwestern Ecuador

Conservation status
- Near Threatened (IUCN 3.1)

Scientific classification
- Kingdom: Animalia
- Phylum: Chordata
- Class: Aves
- Order: Piciformes
- Family: Ramphastidae
- Genus: Andigena
- Species: A. laminirostris

Binomial name
- Andigena laminirostris Gould, 1851

Synonyms
- Andigena lamnirostris

= Plate-billed mountain toucan =

Species of bird

The plate-billed mountain toucan (Andigena laminirostris) is a species of bird in the family Ramphastidae. It is native to the west slope of Ecuador and extreme southern Colombia, where it lives in the high-altitude humid mountain forests of the Andes.

The species has other names like the laminated hill-toucan, laminated mountain-toucan, and plain-billed mountain-toucan.

== Description ==
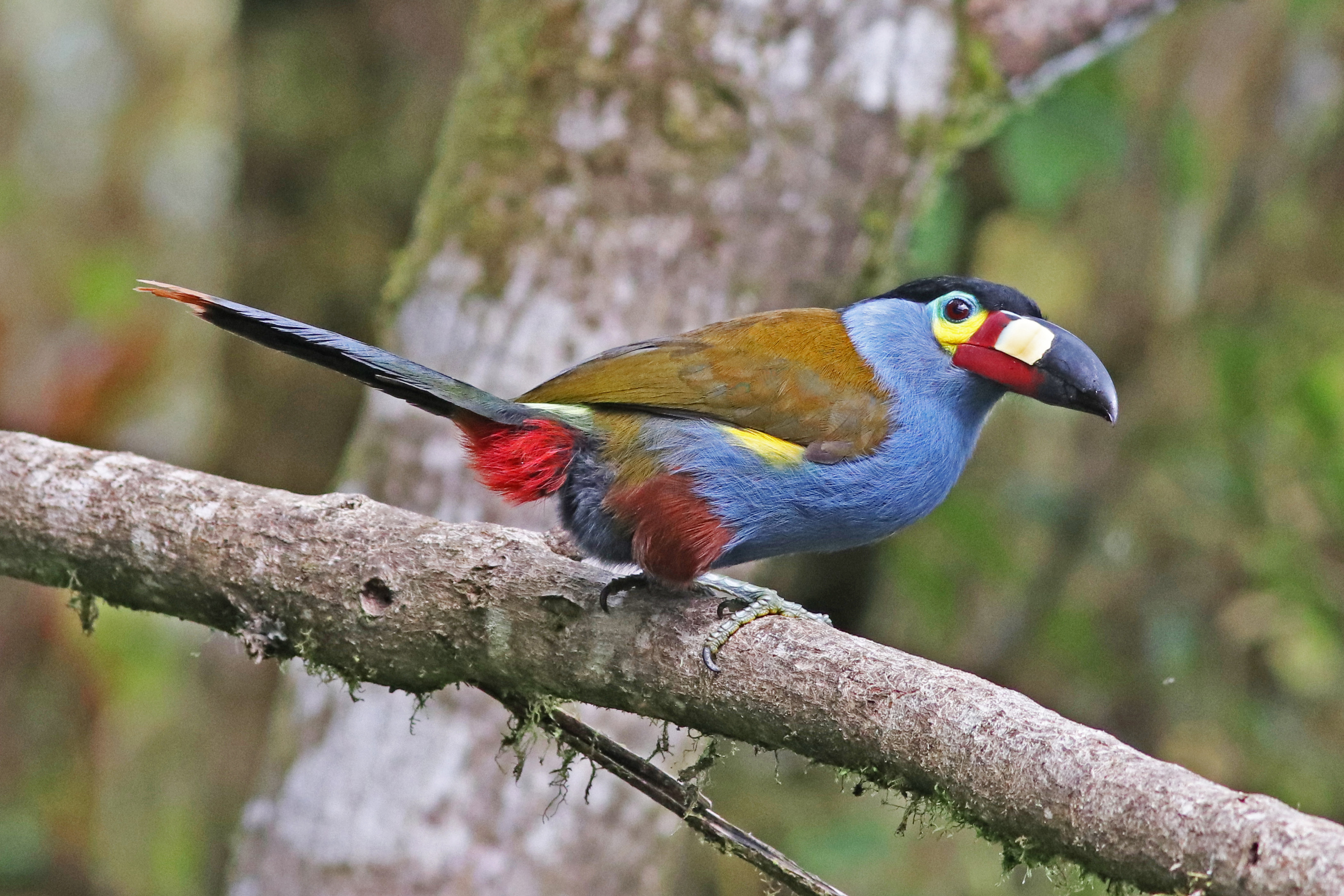
Northwestern Ecuador

Plate-billed Mountain-Toucans have a large laterally compressed bill, the front half of which is black and the back half is mostly red with a raised yellow plate on the upper mandible, a unique feature for which the bird was named. They have a reddish brown iris and a bare ocular area that is yellow below and turquoise green above. The crown and nape are black and the rest of the upper parts are bronzy olive. The side of the neck and underparts are blue gray with a yellow patch on the flanks which is partially covered by the wings. There is a yellow rump patch, and its tail is black with chestnut tips. The crissum (area around the vent) is bright red, and the thighs are brownish maroon.

The plate-billed mountain toucan is about 42 to 53 centimeters (16.5 to 21 inches) in length, with a relatively lightweight bill up to 10 centimeters long. The average male weighs about 314 grams (11.1 ounces) and the female about 303 grams (10.7 ounces). It is zygodactylous, with two toes facing forward and two pointing back.

=== Vocalizations ===
This is the most vocal of the mountain toucans, and the sexes often duet. The male makes a loud, repeating "tryyyyyyyk" sound and the female makes a drier "t't't't't't't't" noise. The bird utters rattles and clicks loud enough to be heard from over a kilometer away.

== Distribution and habitat ==
Plate-billed mountain toucans are found in the western foothills of the Andes of western Ecuador and far southwestern Colombia. In Colombia, they are found from Pita Canyon (Narino) in southwestern Colombia and south to the northwestern border of Morona-Santiago Province, in Ecuador. Plate-billed mountain toucans inhabit the humid forest and edges of the temperate forest of the lateral slope of the Andes Mountains. The humid forest features abundant epiphytes, bromeliads and mosses. These forests receive an average of 14 feet of rainfall per year and the canopy ranges from 6 to 10 meters high. Their altitudinal range is between 1600 and 2600 metres above sea level, and has been observed several times at 3100 metres elevation in Imbabura (Ecuador). Because of its altitudinal range, plate-billed mountain toucans share their ecological niche with the Andean cock-of-the-rock. Their estimated life area is 14300 km2.

== Behaviour and ecology ==
=== Breeding ===
The breeding season extends from March to October, peaking in May through August. The bird nests in tree cavities up to 30 meters above the ground. The clutch contains 2 or 3 white eggs. The eggs are incubated for about 16 days and the young fledge at 46 to 60 days. Once the young depart, the pair may rear a second brood.

=== Food and feeding ===
The plate-billed mountain toucan feeds mainly on fruit, and occasionally eats insects and eggs as well. It disperses the seeds of plants such as the mountain understory shrub Faramea affinis and the palm Prestoea acuminata. There has been a report of the bird eating a caecilian (Caecilia sp.)

== Status ==
While it is still a fairly common species, the Plate-billed mountain toucan is considered Near Threatened by the IUCN and is in decline because of habitat being lost to deforestation. It is also poached for the trade in exotic birds. The plate-billed mountain toucan is the flagship bird of the La Planada Nature Reserve in Colombia.
