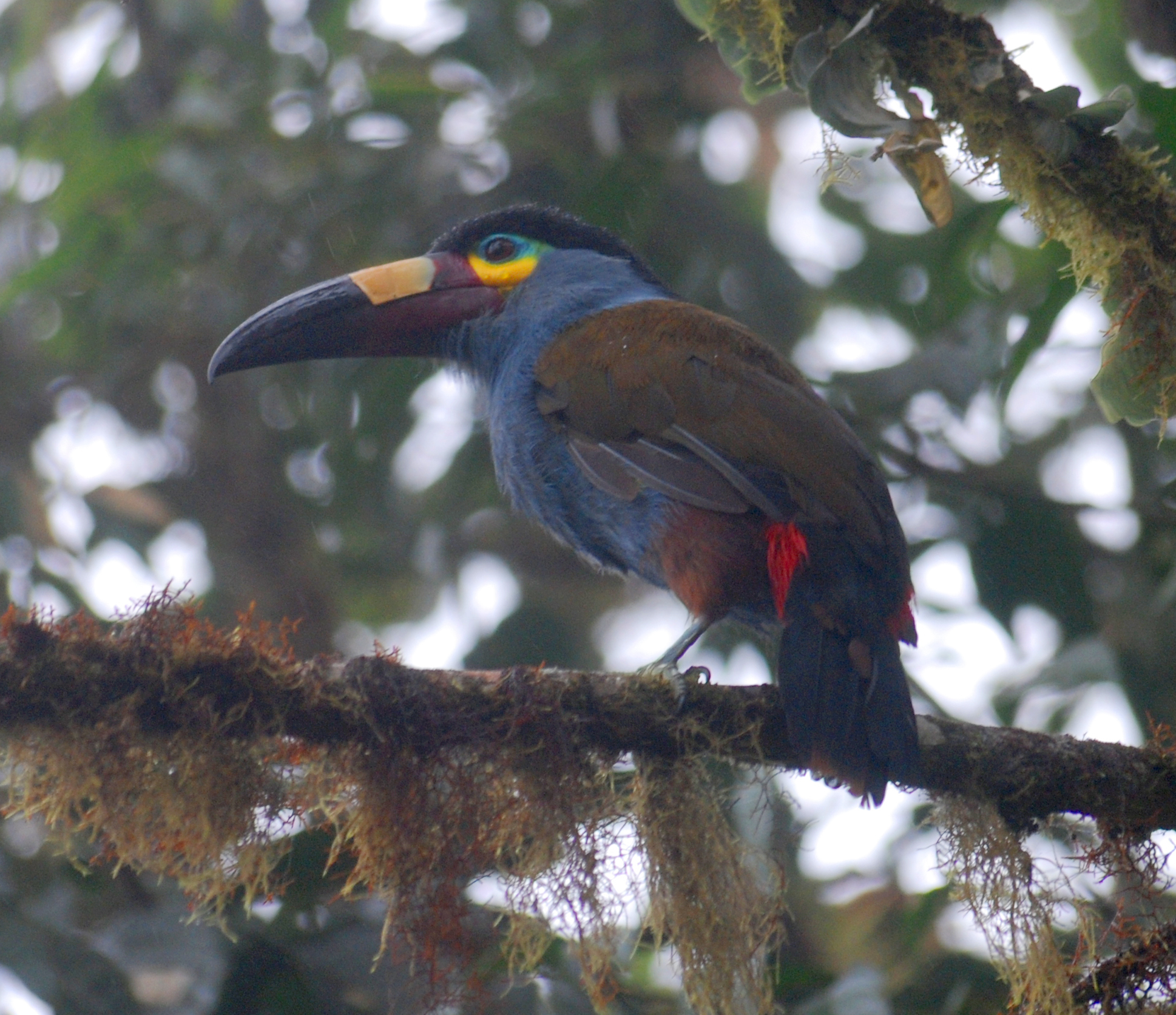
- Plate-billed mountain toucan Andigena laminirostris

Scientific classification
- Kingdom: Animalia
- Phylum: Chordata
- Class: Aves
- Order: Piciformes
- Family: Ramphastidae
- Genus: Andigena; Gould, 1851

Type species
- Pteroglossus hypoglaucus Gould, 1833

Species
- 4, see text

= Mountain toucan =

Genus of birds

Andigena, the mountain toucans, is a genus of birds in the family Ramphastidae. They are found in humid highland forests in the Andes of South America, ranging from Bolivia to Venezuela. These medium-sized toucans all have olive-brown upperparts, a black crown, yellow rump, blue-grey underparts and a red vent.

== Taxonomy and systematics ==
=== Extant species ===
Genus Andigena – Gould, 1851 – four species
| Common name | Scientific name and subspecies | Range | Size and ecology | IUCN status and estimated population |
|---|---|---|---|---|
| Grey-breasted mountain toucan | Andigena hypoglauca (Gould, 1833) Two subspecies: A. h. hypoglauca (Gould, 1833); A. h. lateralis (Chapman, 1923) | Southern Colombia, Ecuador and Peru | Size: Habitat: Diet: | LC |
| Plate-billed mountain toucan | Andigena laminirostris Gould, 1851 | Western Ecuador and far south-western Colombia | Size: Habitat: Diet: | NT |
| Hooded mountain toucan | Andigena cucullata (Gould, 1846) | South-eastern Peru to central Bolivia | Size: Habitat: Diet: | LC |
| Black-billed mountain toucan | Andigena nigrirostris (Waterhouse, 1839) Three subspecies: A. n. nigrirostris (Waterhouse, 1839); A. n. occidentalis (Chapman, 1915); A. n. spilorhynchus (Gould, 1858) | Western Venezuela, Colombia, Ecuador and far northern Peru | Size: Habitat: Diet: | LC |

=== Former species ===
Some authorities, either presently or formerly, recognize additional species or subspecies as species belonging to the genus Andigena including:

- Saffron toucanet (as Andigena bailloni)
