= Guandera Biological Station =

Nature reseve in Ecuador

Espeletia plants in Guandera

The Guandera Biological Station is a biological station established in 1994 and situated in the northern inter-Andean valley of Ecuador. The station is managed by the Jatun Sacha Foundation and is located in Ecuador's Carchi Province..

A species rich valley in the highest reaches of the Andes, Guandera represents the last of forest type that once covered the upper slopes of moister valleys within the tropical Andes from Colombia to Peru. With unusual and distinctive plant forms, Guandera’s appearance is similar to that of a lowland tropical rainforest. However, this forest is nearly 2 ½ miles above sea level and evening temperatures hover around freezing. Also stretching above the tree line, Guandera’s protected area includes an expansive páramo – a type of moist, alpine grassland whose plant forms that are hardly seen in ordinary grounds. A shelter for the Andean spectacled bear, Andean fox, mountain lion, and the grey-breasted mountain toucan, as well as species found only here – such as an endemic cotinga.

In Ecuador, the Andes are divided into two parallel Cordilleras – ranges of lofty mountains hyphenated only by occasional passes and massive, glacier-domed strato-volcanoes. Between these two great ranges lies the Central Valley, whose rich soils and temperate climes support much of the country’s modern population. In fact, this has been the case for millennia. Pre-Columbian civilizations have long toiled the rich volcanic soils found here for crops such as corn, legumes, potatoes and other indigenous tubers as well as to produce textiles derived from the wool of alpacas and llamas, native camelids domesticated by these peoples. Just prior to European contact, Guandera lay in the northernmost reaches of the Incan Empire and to this day is perched above one of Ecuador’s richest agricultural zones. The valley below is intensively cultivated by mestizo farmers – descendants of the Incas whose blood is mixed with that of their European conquerors. As populations and the demand for industrialized crops continue to expand, the cultivated zone of the valley continues to encroach on the remnant forest surrounding the privately protected Guandera Biological Station.

Due to its high altitude and relative remoteness from former seats of power of the Incan Empire as well as modern day Ecuadorian and Colombian population centers, a small strip of native forest within Ecuador’s inter-Andean valley was able to persist through modern times. This remnant forest is situated on the valley-side flanks of the Andean Eastern Cordillera within Ecuador’s northern Carchi Province. The entirety of remaining forest, largely still unprotected and under a steady state of conversion into agricultural lands, spans from just south of the border with Colombia southward to the town of Bolivar, where the Central Valley dips into considerably low altitudes, resulting in a natural transition from Guandera’s form of moist, montane forest to an arid scrub vegetation, now highly degraded after hundreds of years of Afro-Ecuadorian inhabitation. The 10 km^{2} Guandera Biological Station protects the heart of this remnant forest and extends this protection beyond the private reserve through active community extension efforts and regular engagement of Ecuador’s Ministry of the Environment, which manages the El Angel National Park, protecting an expansive páramo grassland on the Western Cordillera, opposite the Guandera Biological Station.

Guandera was founded in 1994, after Dr. Michael McColm, Executive Director of Ecuador’s Jatun Sacha Foundation was tipped off to the presence of this forest by national field botanists. Shortly after his initial visit, Dr. McColm made the move to protect the portion of the forest now within the Biological Station and with subsequent purchases of private lands the entire protected area now occupies 10 km^{2} of primary inter-Andean valley moist, montane forest and paramo.

== Guandera’s uniqueness ==
=== Flora ===
Although similar in many ways to Andean cloud forest, expanses of which still straddle the outer flanks of the Andes in many areas spanning from Venezuela to the north and northernmost Chile and Argentina to south, Guandera’s relative isolation from similar habitat and its geography in the upper altitudes of Ecuador’s inter-Andean valley create distinct and readily observable differences from any other forest type. Although regularly inundated with rain, the presence of clouds actually within the forest is not as usual of an occurrence as with typical cloud forests. Thus, with lower general humidity, the abundance of epiphytes (plants living on the branches and trunks of trees) is somewhat lower than most cloud forests, giving the trees an appearance more similar to lowland rainforest. Guandera’s namesake, the Guandera trees (Clusia spp) are another highly unusual characteristic of this forest. Often dominating large groves, the Guandera tree extends aerial roots from its branches into the ground, eventually forming a near maze of multiple trunks similar in appearance to the banyan trees (Ficus sp.) widely planted in tropical lowlands.

Another unique vegetative character of the forest is that the transition from forest to alpine grassland (in this case, paramo) is atypical of vegetative zonation in the American tropics. In most cases, there is a slow transition from robust forest to alpine grassland with various stages of dwarf (or elvin) forest and shrubland between the two. In Guandera, the transition is dramatically abrupt – one walks from the protective canopy of montane forest directly into grassland, as if someone drew a magic line. In fact, the only semblance of transition is the presence of paramo “islands” within the upper forest and vice versa, the presence of forest “islands” in the lower paramo. At one point it was speculated that such unusual vegetative zonation was the result of human activities such as the grazing of domestic animals or burning of the grasslands. However, French soil scientists have determined that the soils of the forest and the paramos are dramatically different and that the two have persisted side by side like this for millennia, inclusive of the enigmatic “islands”.

Guandera’s paramo is certainly one of Ecuador’s most isolated paramos, and thus buffered from human influence. In fact, in most of the central and southern highlands, indigenous communities live directly within or adjacent to paramos, maintaining high altitude crops and domesticated livestock in those regions. This is not the case in Guandera, where the paramo is surrounded by dense forest and human intervention is generally highly transitory.

Guandera’s paramo is also one of only a couple Ecuadorian paramos characterized by frailejónes – squat, almost human-like bushes of the daisy family whose appearance is said to be reminiscent of a monk (and thus its Spanish namesake).
