= Páramo =

High-altitude wet tundra in South America

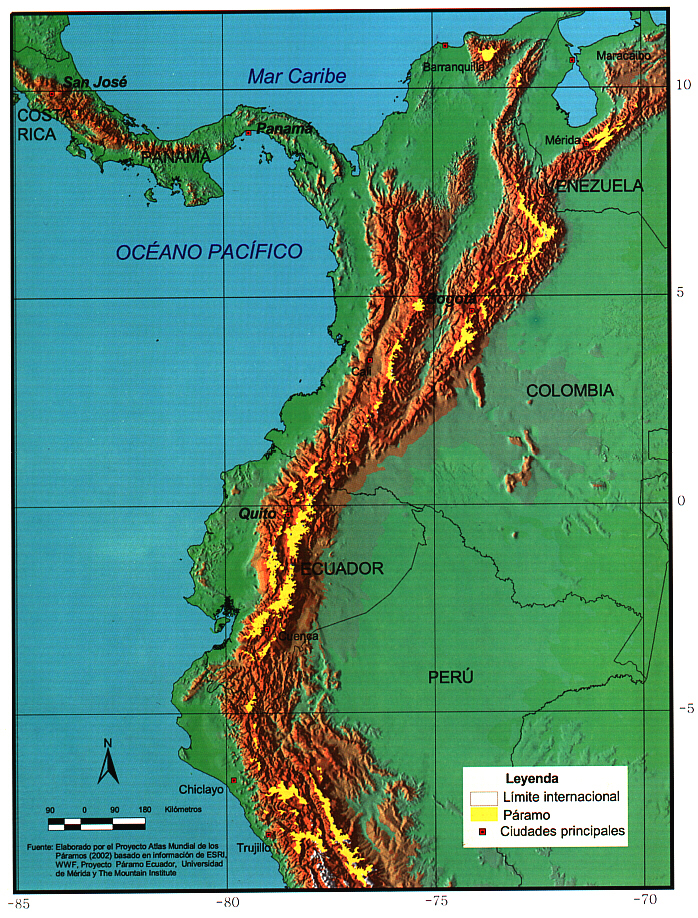
Páramos in yellow

Páramo (Spanish pronunciation: [ˈpaɾamo]) may refer to a variety of alpine tundra ecosystems located in the Andes Mountains in South America. Some ecologists describe the páramo broadly as "all high, tropical, montane vegetation above the continuous timberline". A narrower term classifies the páramo according to its regional placement in the northern Andes of South America and adjacent southern Central America. The páramo is the ecosystem of the regions above the continuous forest line, yet below the permanent snowline. It is a "Neotropical high mountain biome with a vegetation composed mainly of giant rosette plants, shrubs and grasses". According to scientists, páramos may be "evolutionary hot spots", meaning that they are among the fastest evolving regions on Earth.

== Location ==
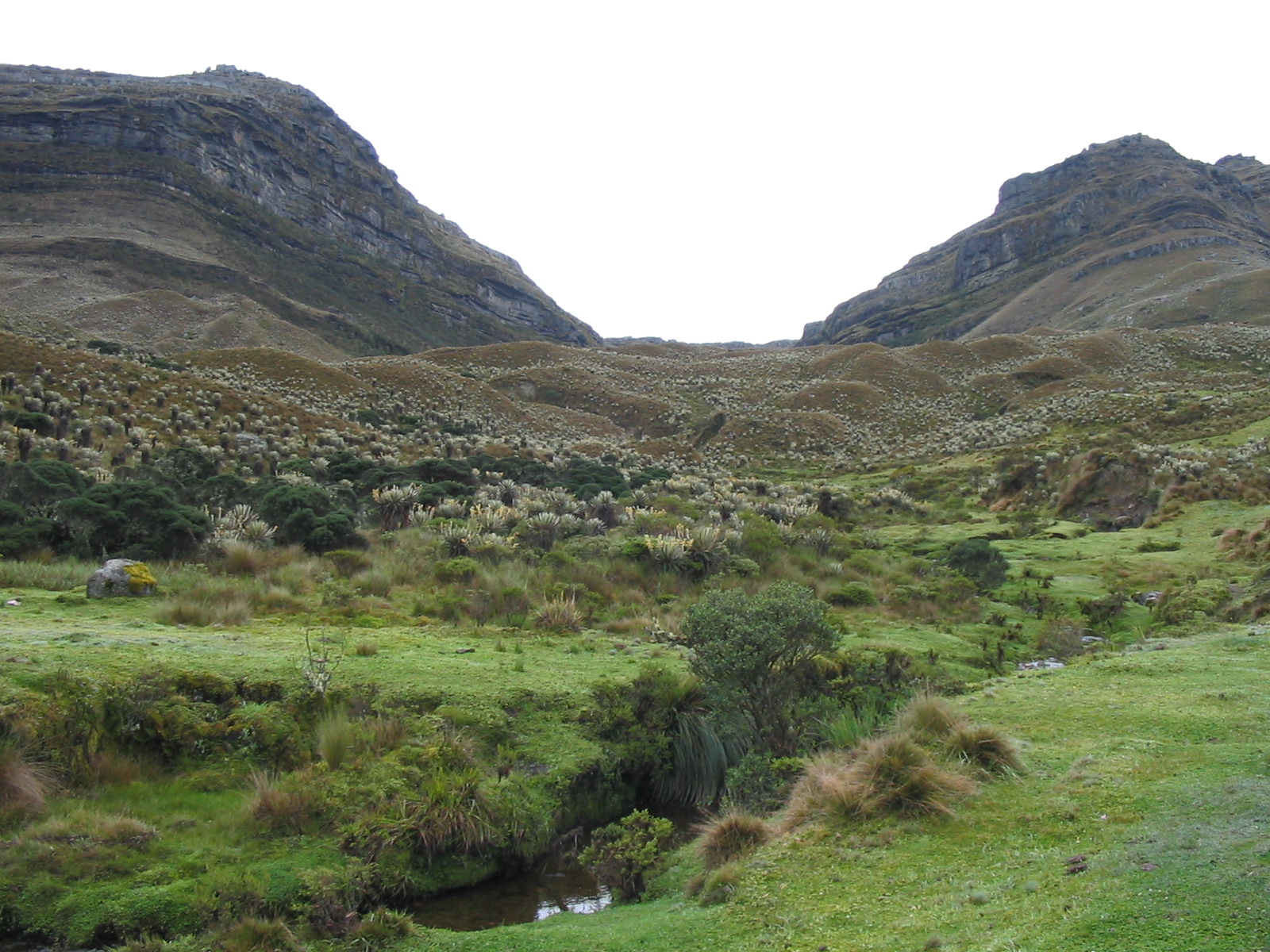
Sumapaz Páramo

The Northern Andean Páramo global ecoregion includes the Cordillera Central páramo (Ecuador, Peru), Santa Marta páramo (Colombia), Cordillera de Merida páramo (Venezuela) and Northern Andean páramo (Colombia, Ecuador) terrestrial ecoregions. The Costa Rican páramo in Costa Rica and Panama is another páramo ecoregion. In the strictest sense of the term, all páramo ecosystems are in the Neotropics, specifically South and Central America. Scattered throughout the regions between 11°N and 8°S latitudes, these ecosystems are mainly in the northwest corner of South America, in Colombia, Ecuador, Peru, and Venezuela.

In Venezuela, the páramo occurs in the Cordillera de Mérida. Páramo ecosystems are also found in the Sierra Nevada de Santa Marta in Colombia, and in the regions of Huehuetenango and El Quiché of Guatemala in the Sierra de los Cuchumatanes. The Cordillera de Talamanca of Costa Rica and the westernmost part of Panama has páramo. In northern Ecuador, the Guandera Biological Station is a fairly undisturbed páramo ecosystem.

The majority of the páramo ecosystems occur in the Colombian Andes. The Sumapaz Páramo, south of the Altiplano Cundiboyacense in the Eastern Ranges of the Colombian Andes (about 20 kilometres (12 mi) south of Bogotá), is the largest páramo in the world. This region was declared a National Park of Colombia in 1977 because of its importance as a biodiversity hotspot and main source of water for the most densely populated area of the country, the Bogotá Savannah. The 5.7-square-kilometre (1,405-acre) Páramo Wildlife Refuge Park in the San José Province of Costa Rica "protects tropical forest areas in the high elevations of the Talamanca Mountains".

Cotopaxi National Park contains 329.9 square kilometres (81,524 acres) of protected land in the Cotopaxi Province of Ecuador. Much of this park is páramo. Its flora includes gentians, clubmosses, valerians, and asters such as Loricaria and Chuquiraga species.

== Climate ==
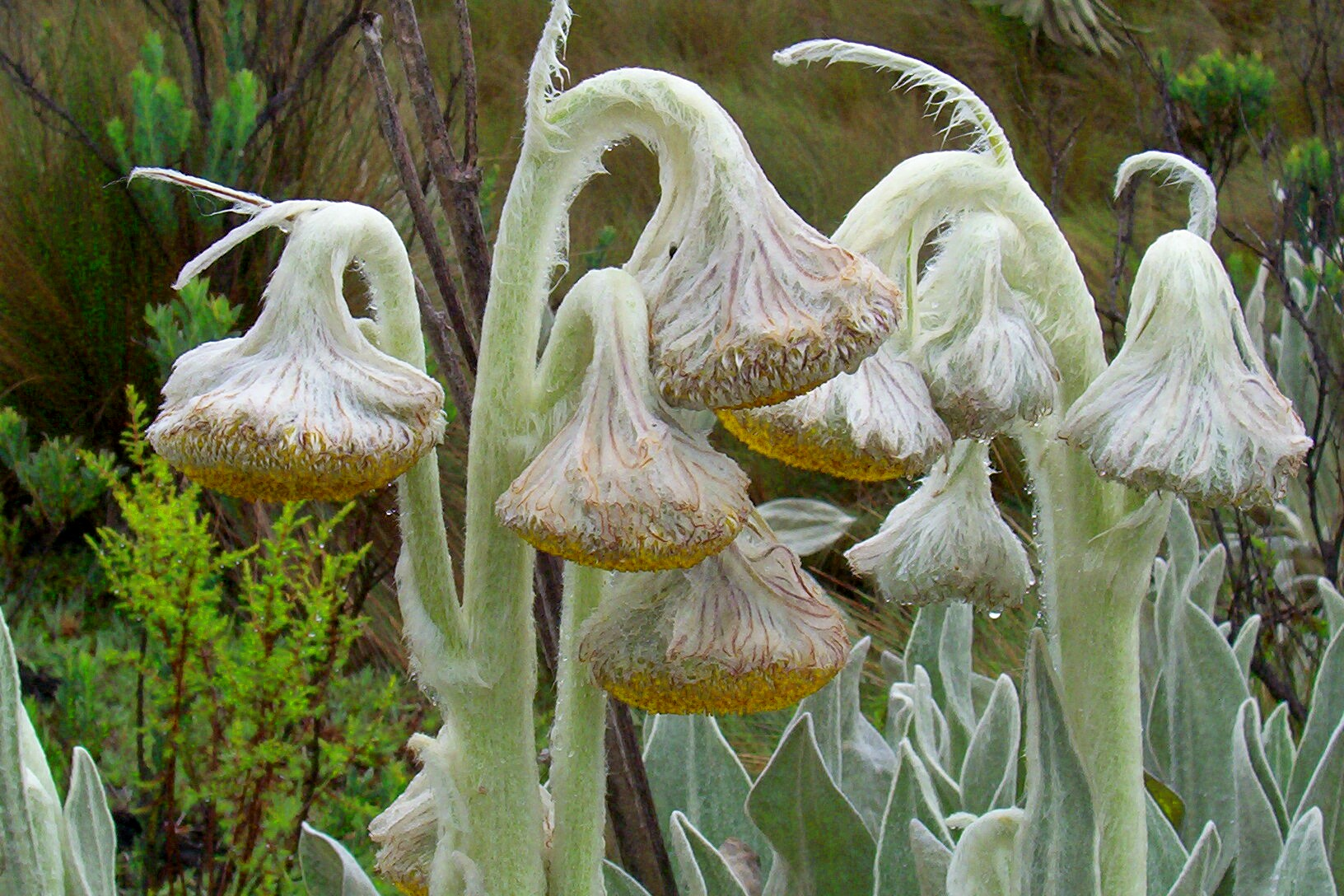
Culcitium sp. in Páramo de Chiles, Carchi, Ecuador.

Páramo climates differ slightly depending on the specific location. In Colombia and northern Ecuador, air masses from the Intertropical Convergence Zone (ITCZ) have a substantial effect on the climate, and these regions tend to be consistently humid (approx. 70–85%) throughout the year. The Andes also play a key role in the climate of these regions as they cause an orographic uplift in which moist air rises. This creates continuous moisture via rain, clouds, and fog, with many of them receiving over 2,000 mm (79 in) of rain annually.

The páramos of the northernmost Andes of Venezuela, northern Colombia, and Costa Rica experience a different climate due to the dry season, which is caused by northeasterly trade winds. Southern Ecuador and northern Peru experience the most severe dryness as they are influenced by an air mass from the Amazon Basin, which releases its moisture on the eastern slopes, as well as another air mass from the west that is influenced by the Humboldt Current.

Overall, páramo climates are known for their daily fluctuations in temperature and humidity. While they are generally cold and humid ecosystems, they often undergo a sudden and drastic change in weather in which they fluctuate between temperatures from below freezing to 10 °C (50 °F). This oscillation often results in a daily freeze-and-thaw cycle. Mean annual temperatures of páramo ecosystems range from 2 to 10 °C (36 to 50 °F), with increasingly colder temperatures at higher latitudes.

== Soils ==
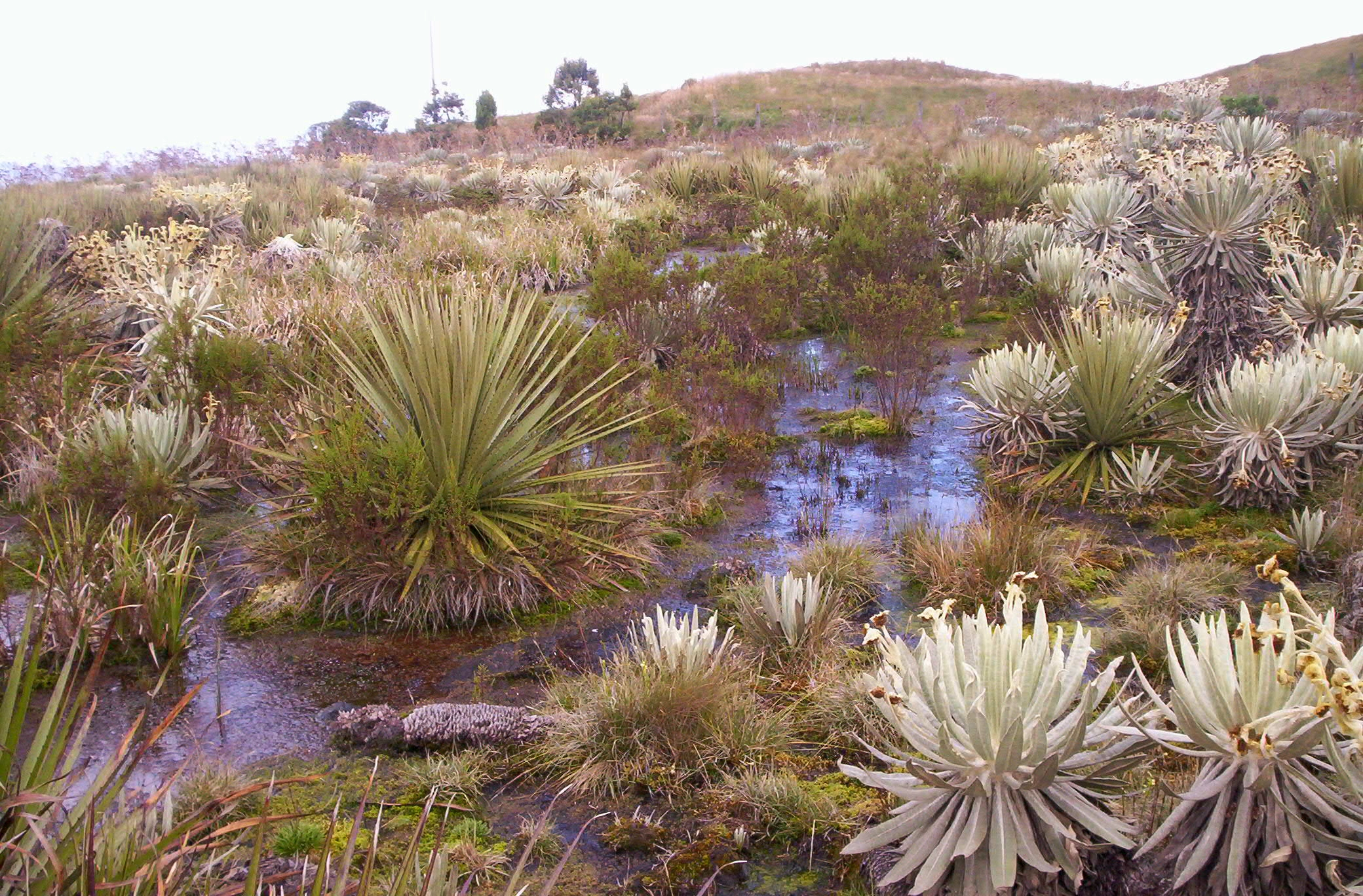
Páramo de Rabanal, Boyacá, Colombia

Soils in páramo ecosystems vary, but most are young and partially weathered. The soil has a relatively low pH because of an abundance of moisture and organic content. Organic content, even within disturbed sites averages very high which contributes to water retention in the soil. During cold and wet weather, there are few nutrients available and productivity is very low in páramo soils. Soils in páramo ecosystems have changed because of human activity, especially due to burning vegetation to clear land for grazing.

Soils in the south Ecuadorian páramo are characterized broadly into Andisols, Inceptisols, Histosols, Entisols, and Mollisols. Recently, there has been an increase in Andisol soils, largely due to more volcanic activity. These soils have a very high water retention rate, which contributes to the rise in cultivation and differential land use. This water supply stored in the soil in the higher elevation páramo in the Andes becomes the water supply for Andean settlements in lower altitudes.

== Vegetation zones ==
Páramos are divided into separate zones based on elevation and vegetative structure, with the three main types of páramo vegetation unequally distributed throughout different zones. As of 2021, more than 3,000 plant species have been discovered in the páramo.

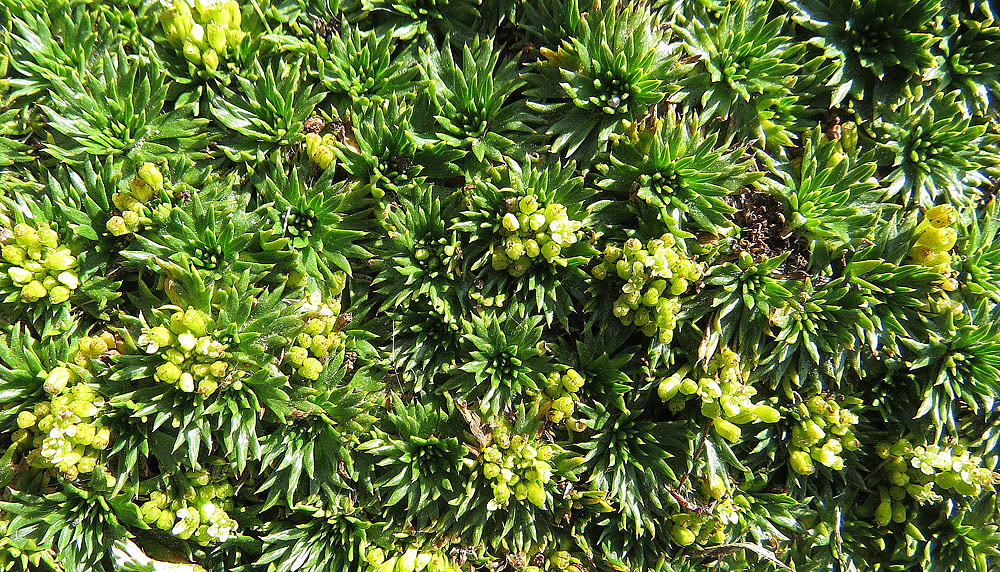
Azorella pedunculata

Superpáramo is at the highest elevation and is usually considered to be the transition zone between the higher, permanent snow region and the lower grass páramo zone. The superpáramo zone is generally narrow and exists atop loose stones and sandy soils at about 4,500–4,800 m (14,800–15,700 ft). It has the lowest air temperature, precipitation level, soil water-holding capacity, and nutrient content of all the zones. Being the highest in elevation, it also has the highest levels of solar radiation and night frost. For this reason, vegetation in the superpáramo must be highly resistant to such severe fluctuations in weather. Air temperatures are low—cold at night and cool during the day—with daily oscillations greater than the oscillations of monthly averages. Due to its localization on high mountains, this area is the least disturbed by humans and contains the most endemic species of all the zones. Flora includes Azorella pedunculata of the family Apiaceae and species from the families Asteraceae, Fabaceae, and Ericaceae.

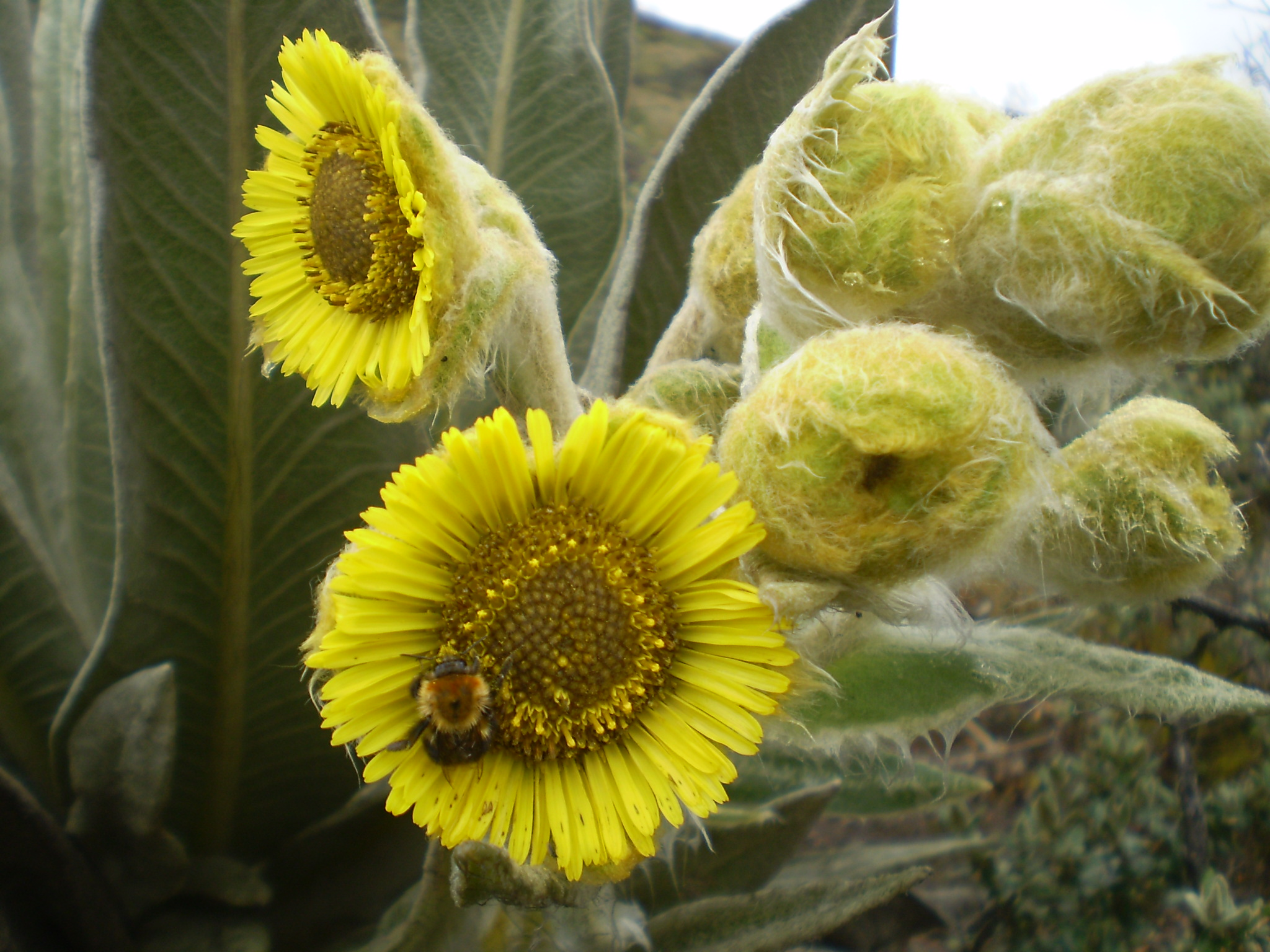
Espeletia grandiflora, Páramo de Guerrero, Colombia

The most broadly described zone is the grass páramo. Grass páramos cover large areas of mountain ranges, while others are limited to small areas on slopes and summits of very high mountains. The term páramo is sometimes used to refer to this specific type. It has continuous vegetation and plant cover with a "yellowish to olive–brown" look due to the combination of dead and living grasses. The grass páramo extends from approximately 3,500–4,100 m (11,500–13,500 ft), and is composed of mostly tussock grasses. Calamagrostis intermedia and other grasses of the genera Calamagrostis and Festuca tend to dominate this zone. Other common vegetation includes large and small shrubs, stunted trees, cushion plants, herbs, and rosette plants. While these are the dominant species, grass páramos can also contain tall- and short-grass communities, including herbaceous and woody vegetation. Due to its easier access and high levels of grass, this zone is more impacted by humans and suffers from both burning and grazing activities.

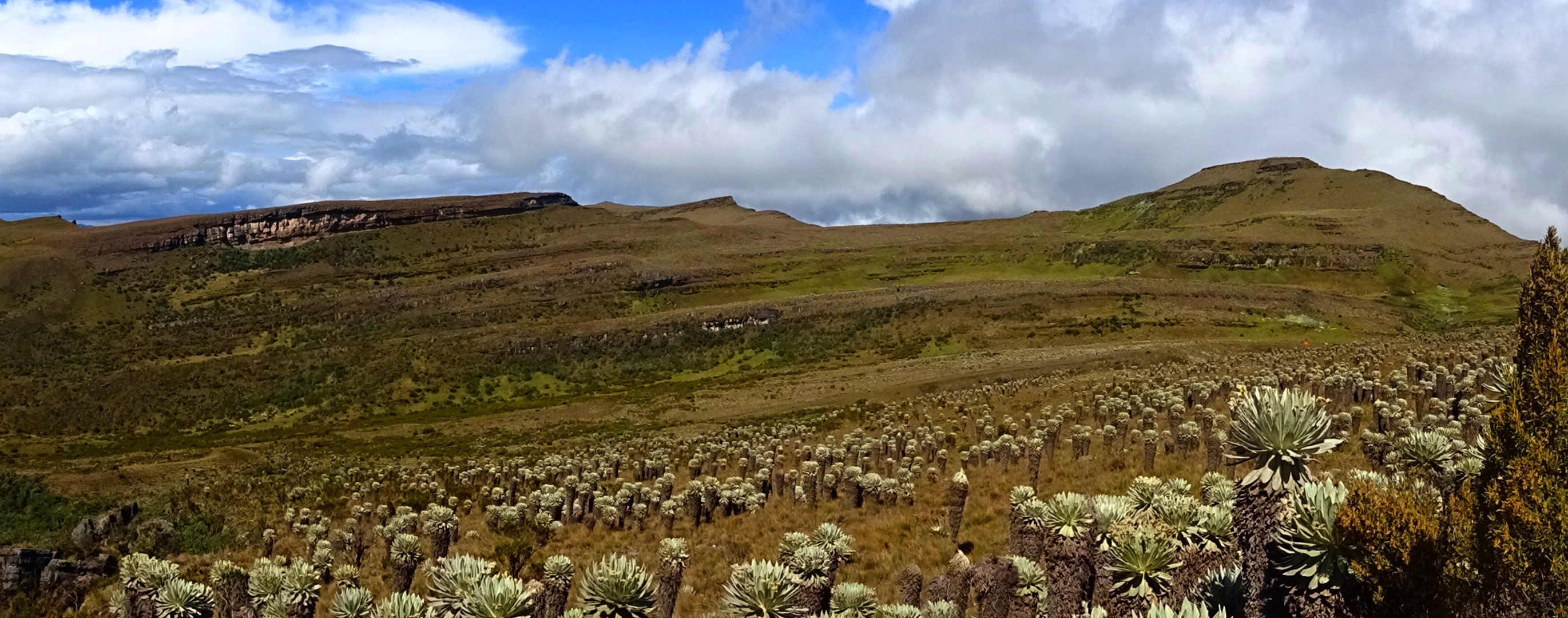
Ocetá Páramo, Colombia. The Playa de los Frailejones

Subpáramo is the lowest and most diverse zone. At 3,000–3,500 m (9,800–11,500 ft), it is a shrub-dominated zone that combines aspects of both the grass páramo above and the forest below. Along with shrubs, this zone also contains small, scattered trees which gradually transition into the grasses and herbs of the grass páramo above. Plant communities in this vegetation zone are also known to include thickets that are mainly composed of shrubby or woody vegetation, including species from the genera Ilex, Ageratina, and Baccharis. Fragmented forests can appear in the subpáramo due to microclimatic or edaphic conditions, yet the more abrupt changes are generally due to anthropogenic disruption such as cutting, burning, and grazing activities. Because of these high levels of disruption, it is believed that subpáramos are made up of largely secondary-growth communities. The high levels of disruption also make this zone particularly difficult to define, as humans typically extend and expand the zone for their own purposes, sometimes over hundreds or thousands of years. This has altered forest lines, often lowering them by several hundred meters, which has also affected the altitudinal zonation for many animals.

Lichens are widely distributed in all types of paramos, however different growth forms may be favoured by environmental conditions. For example, extreme conditions associated with rocky substrates and high elevations favour crustose lichens, while foliose and fruticose lichens are associated with less extreme conditions and mid altitudes. The atmospheric factors such as humidity and temperature positively favour taller lichens, due to an increase in locally available water.

== Fauna ==
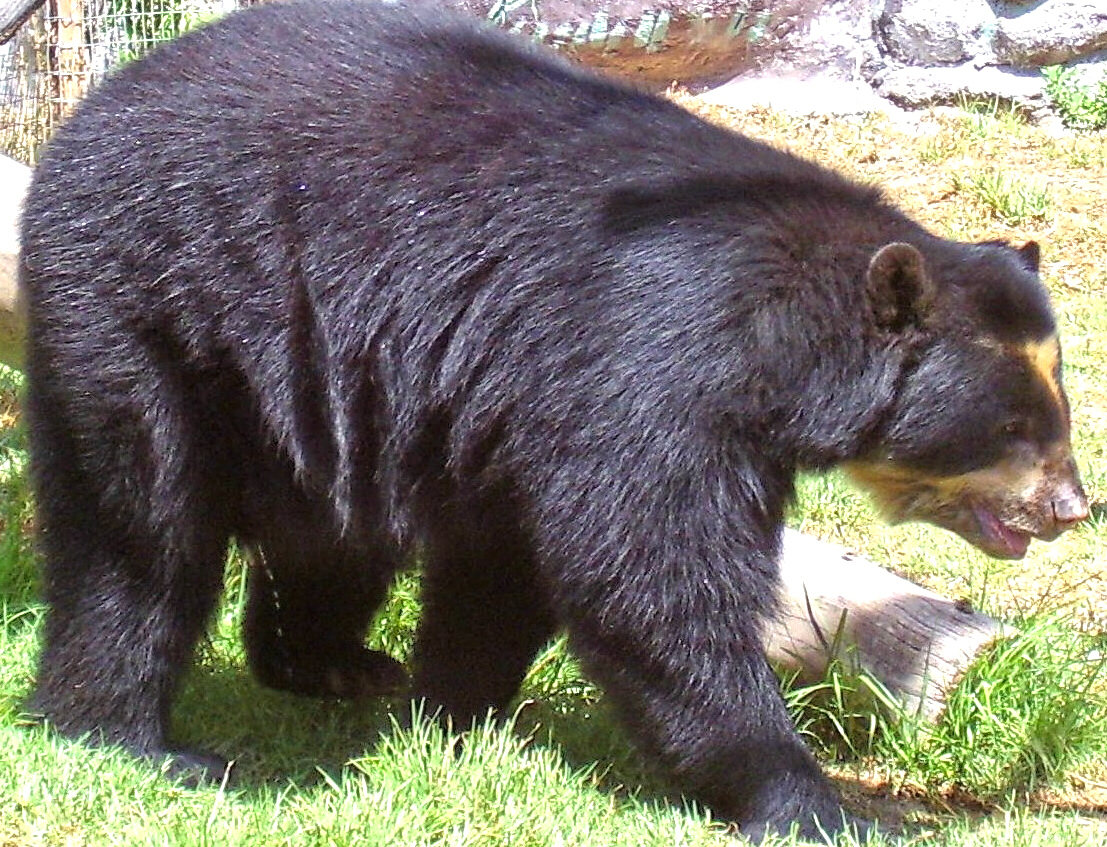
Tremarctos ornatus, the spectacled bear or Andean bear is the only surviving species of bear native to South America.

The vegetation of the páramo provides shelter and habitat for a variety of mammals, birds, insects, amphibians, and reptiles. Some animals commonly found in páramo ecosystems include the Culpeo (sometimes called the páramo wolf), the white-tailed deer, and the spectacled bear (Tremarctos ornatus) which occasionally forages in the high páramo for its favored food, Puya bromeliads. Invertebrates such as grasshoppers, cockroaches, beetles, and flies are found in the subpáramo. Amphibians have been well documented in páramo ecosystems, including salamanders such as Bolitoglossa species and frogs such as Pristimantis and Atelopus species. Reptiles include lizards of the genera Stenocercus, Phenacosaurus, and Proctoporus.

Sixty-nine species of birds are considered to be "total users" of páramo habitats, with "41 species making it their primary habitat and 16 as indicator species". The Andean condor (Vultur gryphus), also called "king of the Andes", is known for its wide wingspan, but is no longer frequently seen. The most numerous bird families in the páramo include eagles, hummingbirds, ovenbirds, thraupid "finches", and tyrant flycatchers. Some hummingbirds tolerate the cold climate by going into "a kind of nightly hibernation."

Hummingbirds, bees and flies are all important pollinators in the páramo, while birds and smaller mammals such as rabbits and guinea pigs are important seed dispersers. Many of the larger mammals of the páramo are rare due to hunting.

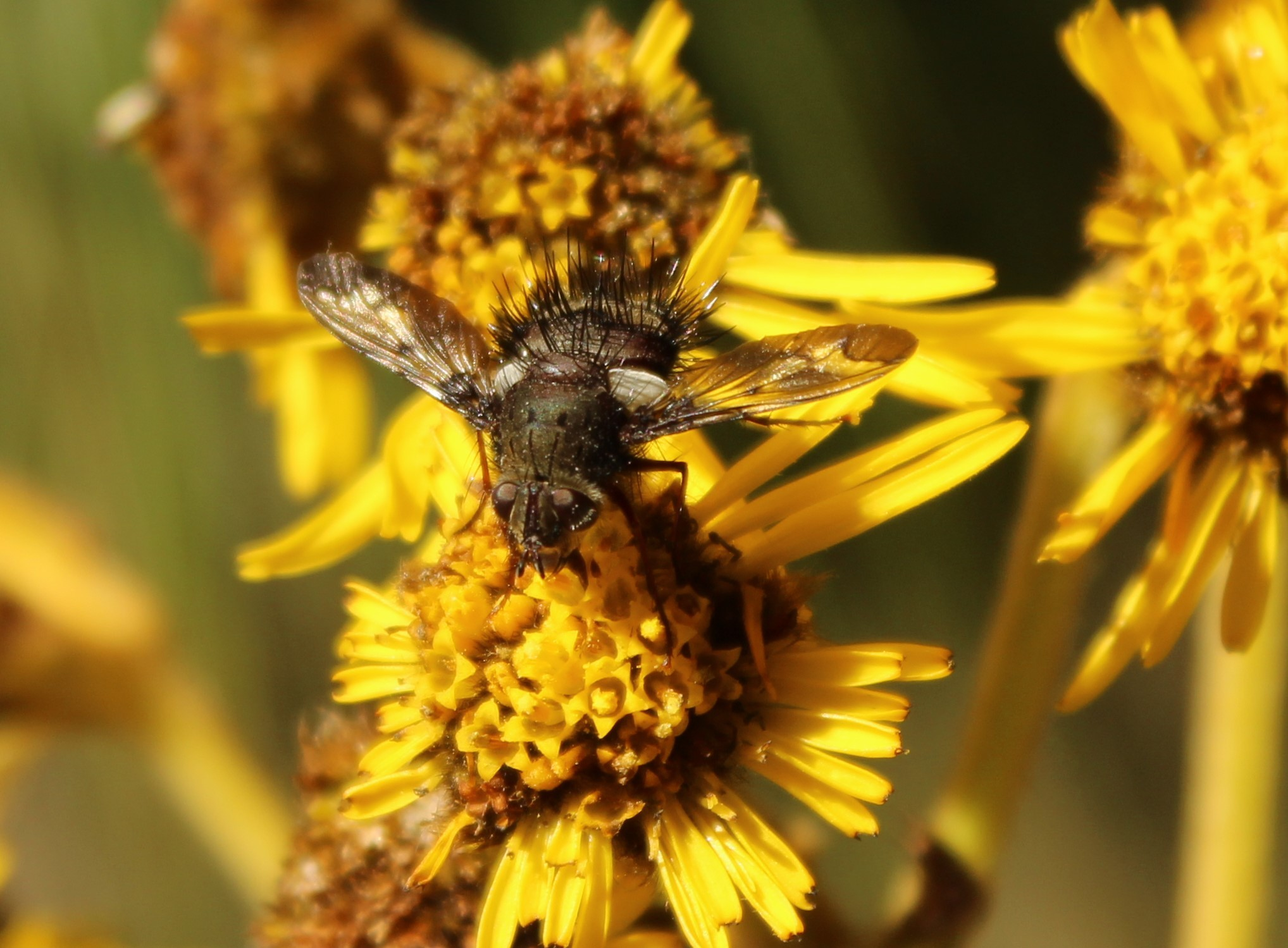
Echinopyrrhosia pollinating Espeletia boyacensis in the Pan de Ázucar páramo, Duitama, Colombia

== Human impact and climate change ==
Humans have inhabited the páramo of the Andes for approximately the past 15,000 years. Deforestation has been extensive and in some cases, like the northern Andes, 90-95% of forests have been cleared. Other sites in Venezuela and Colombia show evidence that humans settled there at least 800 years ago and used the land for agriculture and hunting.

When Europeans came to the Americas they introduced exotic plants and animals that greatly affected the land, especially cattle, which were introduced to the páramos in the early 18th century. By the 20th century the growing population of settlers led to an increased demand for land, and páramo ecosystems suffered accordingly. As more land was needed for cattle, fire was used to clear land, and eventually páramos became excessively burned and overgrazed. Both burning and grazing have damaged vegetation, soils, species diversity, and water storage capacity of the páramos. In burned and disturbed sites that were studied in the Andes the pH and phosphorus concentration in the soil are higher than in non-burned sites.

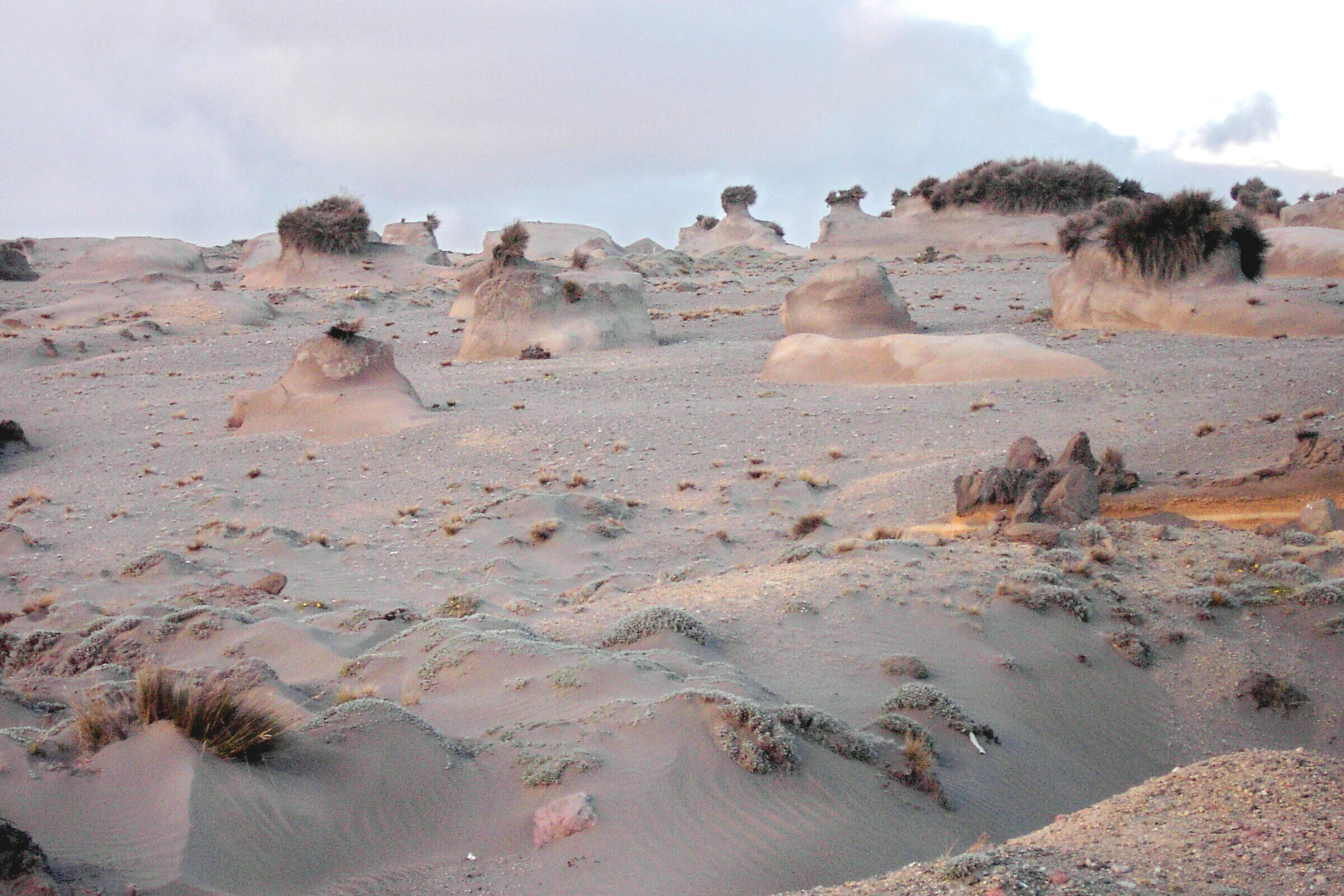
Erosion in a páramo, caused by wind and overgrazing

Climate change is becoming an increasingly pressing issue for páramo ecosystems. Growing populations in Colombia, Venezuela, and Ecuador have forced settlements in higher elevations covering more páramo. Recent developments such as construction of aqueducts, drainage systems, and roads, mining, and afforestation have been a huge additional páramo disturbance.

Increases in temperature extremes are forcing many fauna and flora species to higher grounds, and eventually they could face extinction. The flora of páramos is adapted to specific conditions and is thus vulnerable to even small climate changes. Climate change in the Andes is causing glaciers in the páramo to disappear and a drop in rainfall, virtually drying up páramo and in turn, drying up the water supply for cities such as Quito, Ecuador and Bogotá, Colombia.

On 8 February 2016, the Constitutional Court of Colombia banned all mining operations in the paramos, prioritising the protection of the environment, and terminating 347 mining licenses that had operational rights in the ecosystem.

== Cultural references ==
The 2018 film "Sacred Water" was made in the paramo region of Chingaza in Colombia.

The 2023 short documentary, "Sun and Thunder" about Nasa indigenous activist Nora Taquines, was filmed in the paramo region.

The feature film, "A Vanishing Fog" was filmed in the páramo.
