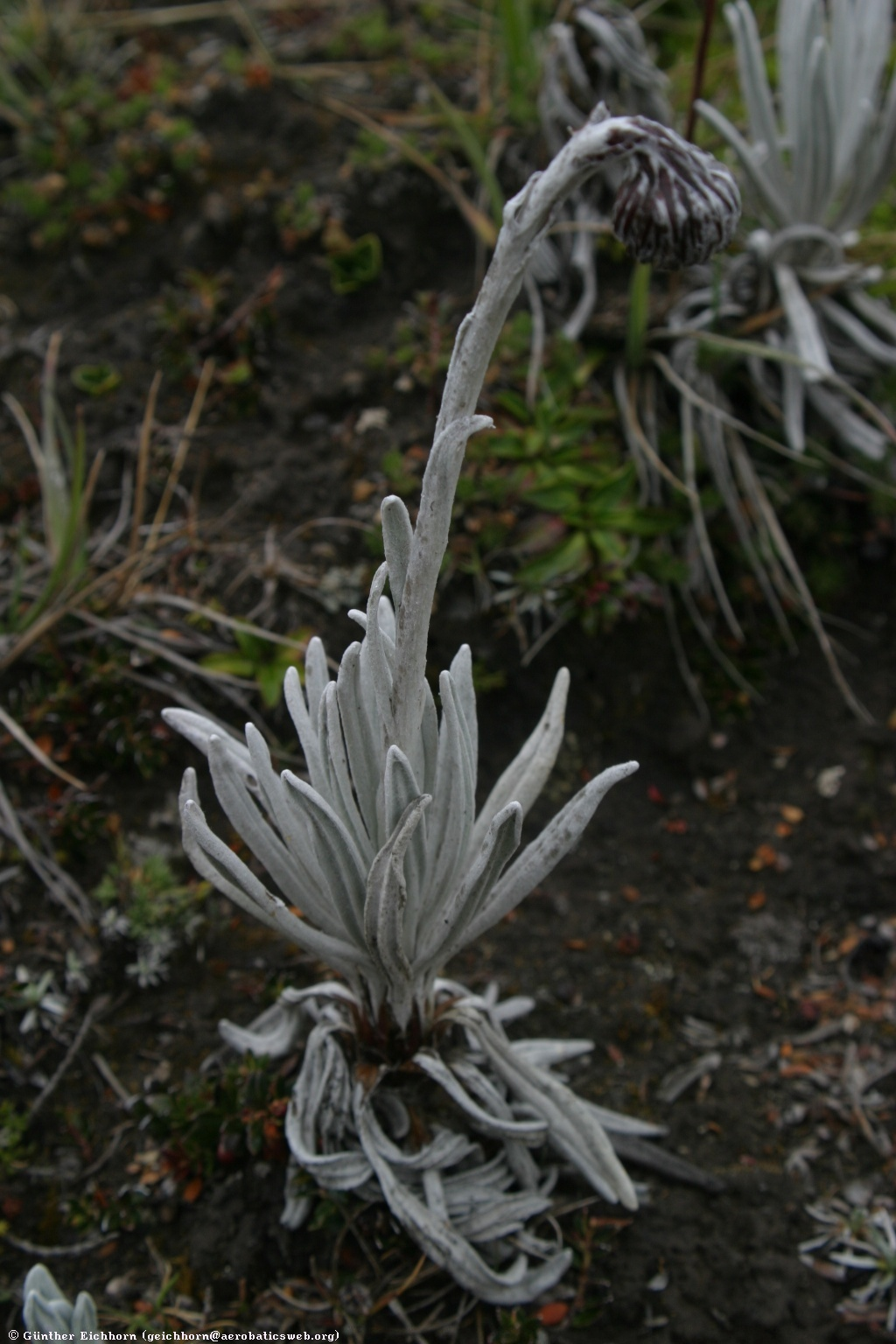
- Growing on Cotopaxi, Ecuador

Scientific classification
- Kingdom: Plantae
- Clade: Tracheophytes
- Clade: Angiosperms
- Clade: Eudicots
- Clade: Asterids
- Order: Asterales
- Family: Asteraceae
- Genus: Culcitium
- Species: C. nivale

Binomial name
- Culcitium nivale Kunth

Synonyms
- Senecio nivalis (Kunth) Cuatrec.

= Culcitium nivale =

Species of flowering plant

Culcitium nivale, synonym Senecio nivalis, is a flowering plant in the aster family Asteraceae, native to Ecuador and Peru.
