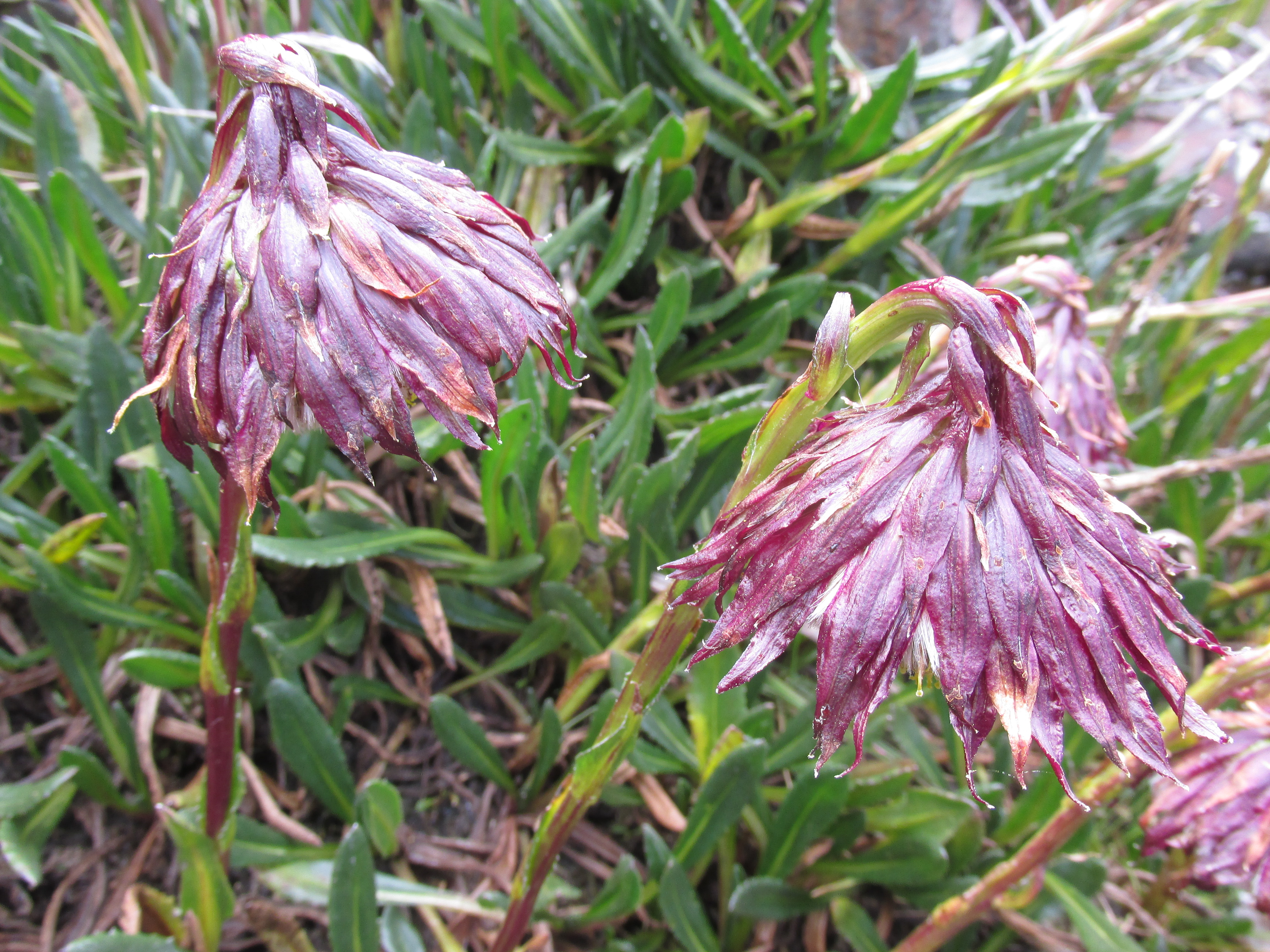
- Senecio serratifolius (now Culcitium serratifolium)

Scientific classification
- Kingdom: Plantae
- Clade: Embryophytes
- Clade: Tracheophytes
- Clade: Spermatophytes
- Clade: Angiosperms
- Clade: Eudicots
- Clade: Asterids
- Order: Asterales
- Family: Asteraceae
- Subfamily: Asteroideae
- Tribe: Senecioneae
- Genus: Culcitium; Bonpl.

= Culcitium =

Genus of flowering plants

Culcitium is a genus of flowering plants belonging to the family Asteraceae. Its native range is western and southern South America.

Species:

- Culcitium albifolium Zoellner
- Culcitium candidum D.Don ex Hook. & Arn.
- Culcitium canescens Bonpl.
- Culcitium dasyphyllum Gand.
- Culcitium depressum D.Don ex Hook. & Arn.
- Culcitium gilliesii (Hook. & Arn.) Speg.
- Culcitium haenkei Wedd.
- Culcitium herrerae Mattf. ex Herrera
- Culcitium magellanicum Hombr. & Jacquinot ex Decne.
- Culcitium neaei Sch.Bip. ex Wedd.
- Culcitium nivale Kunth
- Culcitium oligocephalum Cabrera
- Culcitium peruvianum Klatt
- Culcitium pflanzii Perkins
- Culcitium rufescens Bonpl.
- Culcitium serratifolium Meyen & Walp.
- Culcitium tenellum Dusén
