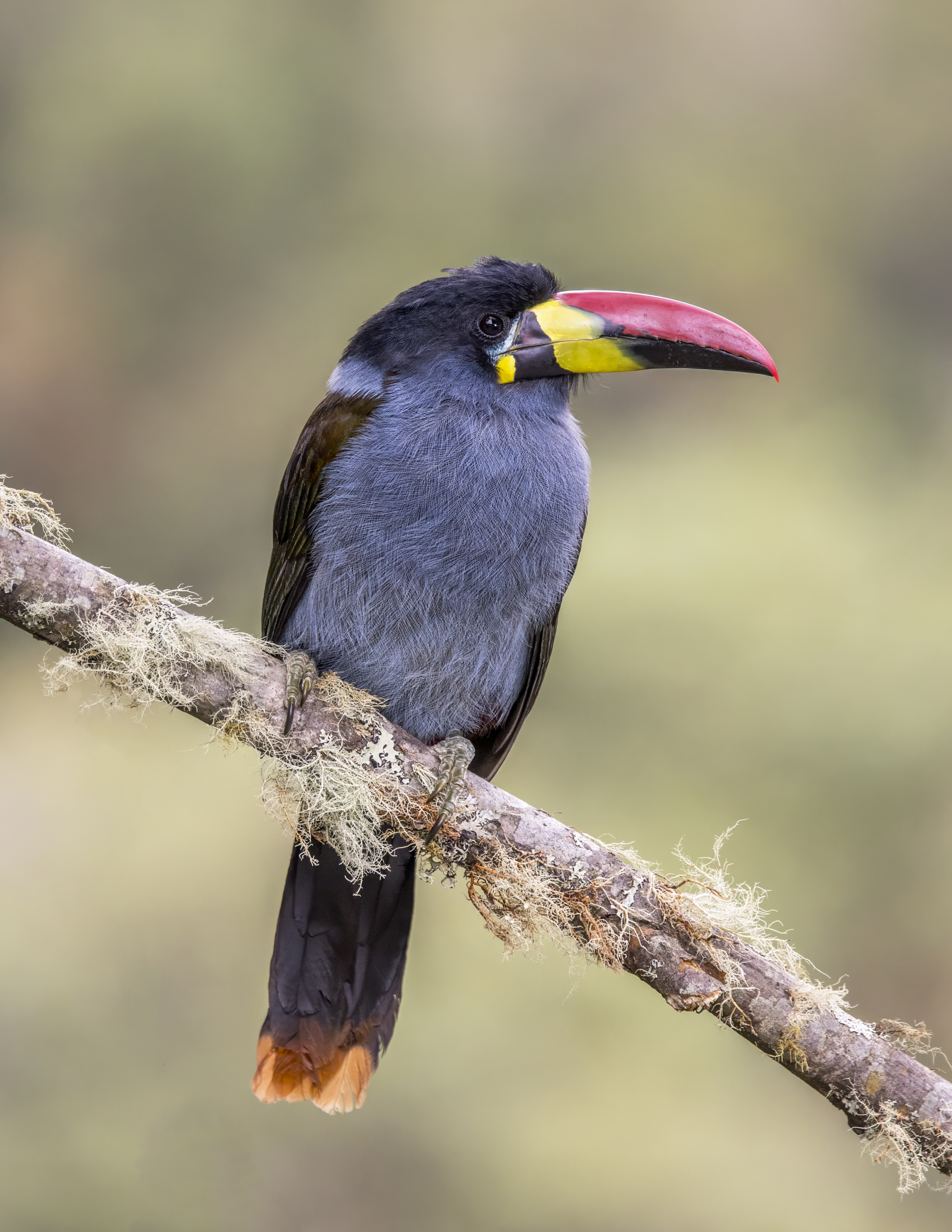
- A. h. hypoglauca, Colombia
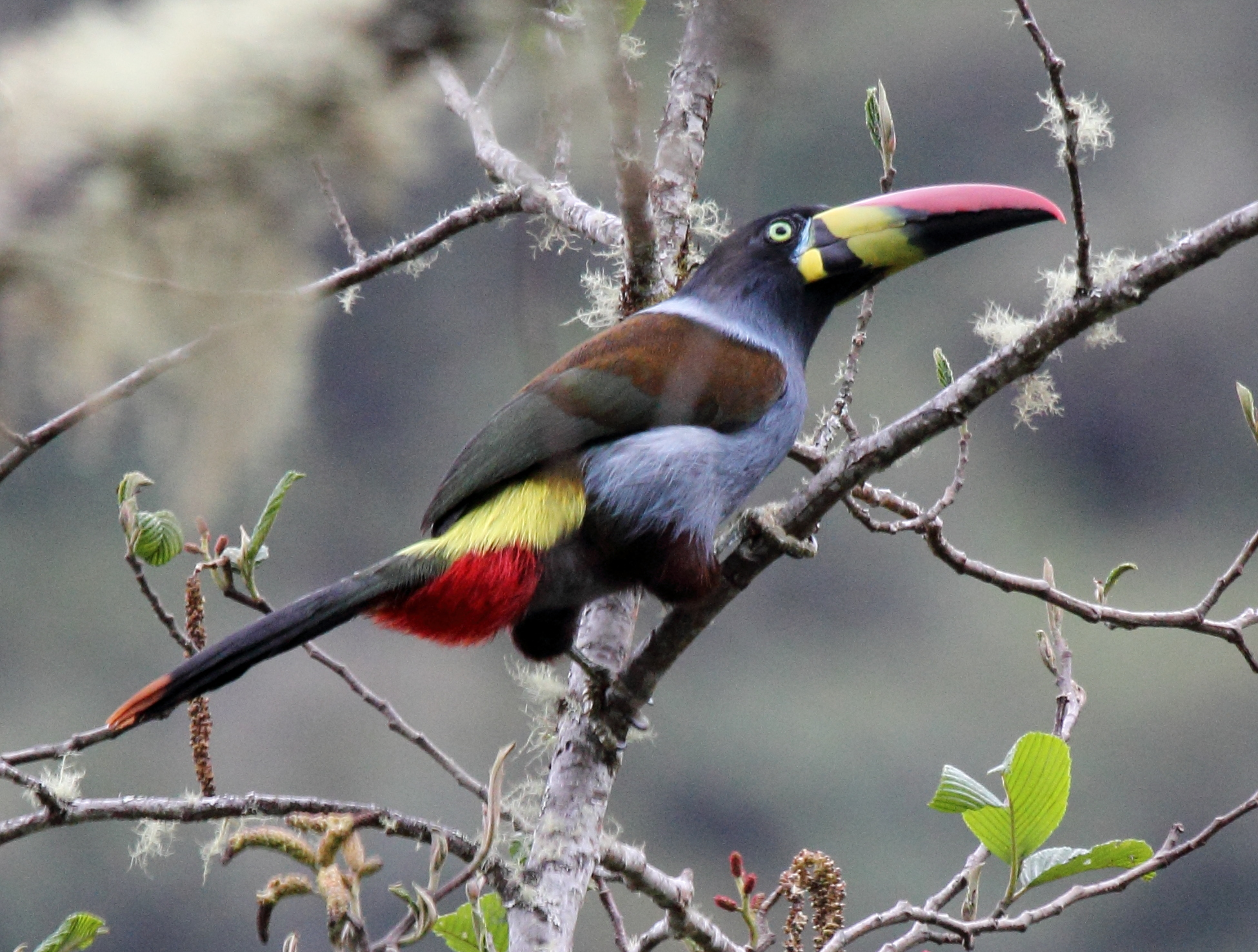
- A. h. lateralis, Peru

Conservation status
- Least Concern (IUCN 3.1)

Scientific classification
- Kingdom: Animalia
- Phylum: Chordata
- Class: Aves
- Order: Piciformes
- Family: Ramphastidae
- Genus: Andigena
- Species: A. hypoglauca

Binomial name
- Andigena hypoglauca (Gould, 1833)
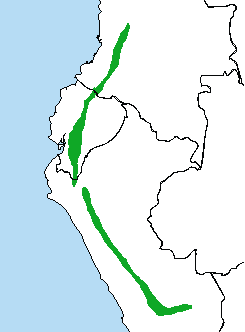
- Range of grey-breasted mountain toucan

Synonyms
- Pteroglossus hypoglaucus (protonym)

= Grey-breasted mountain toucan =

Species of bird

The grey-breasted mountain toucan (Andigena hypoglauca) is a least-concern species of bird in the toucan family, Ramphastidae. It is found in South American countries such as Colombia, Ecuador and Peru.

== Taxonomy and systematics ==
The grey-breasted mountain toucan was originally described in the genus Pteroglossus. Two subspecies are recognized, the nominate:

Image	Subspecies	Distribution
	A. h. hypoglauca (Gould, 1833)	Central Colombia to eastern Ecuador
	A. h. lateralis (Chapman, 1923).	Eastern Ecuador and central Peru

== Description ==
The grey-breasted mountain toucan is 41 to 48 cm (16 to 19 in) long and weighs 244 to 370 g (8.6 to 13 oz). Males and females within each subspecies have the same plumage, and the two subspecies have the same bill pattern though the female's bill is shorter. The bill's base is yellow to greenish with a black band near the base. The maxilla's outer 2/3 is red, meeting the yellow diagonally. The mandible's outer half is black. Both subspecies have a black cap, face, and nape; a gray-blue band on the hindneck; a greenish brown back; and gray to gray-blue underparts. Their tail is blackish with chestnut tips on the two or three central pairs of feathers. The nominate subspecies has a bright yellow rump, pale gray-blue flanks, chestnut thighs, and red undertail coverts. Its eye is brown and surrounded by bare blue skin. Subspecies A. h. lateralis has a paler yellow rump than the nominate, pale yellow to gray-white flanks, and a yellow to green eye.

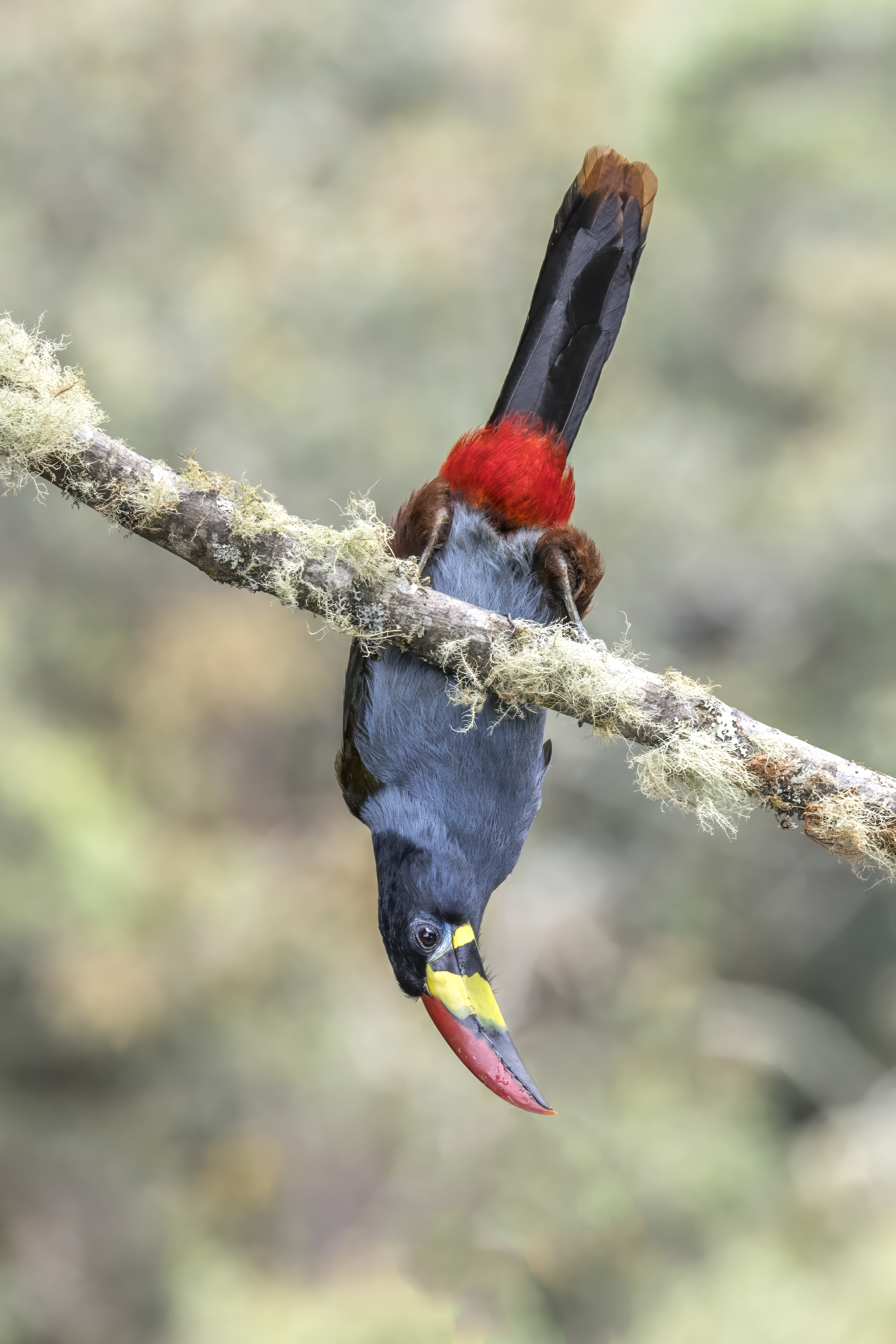
Showing underside

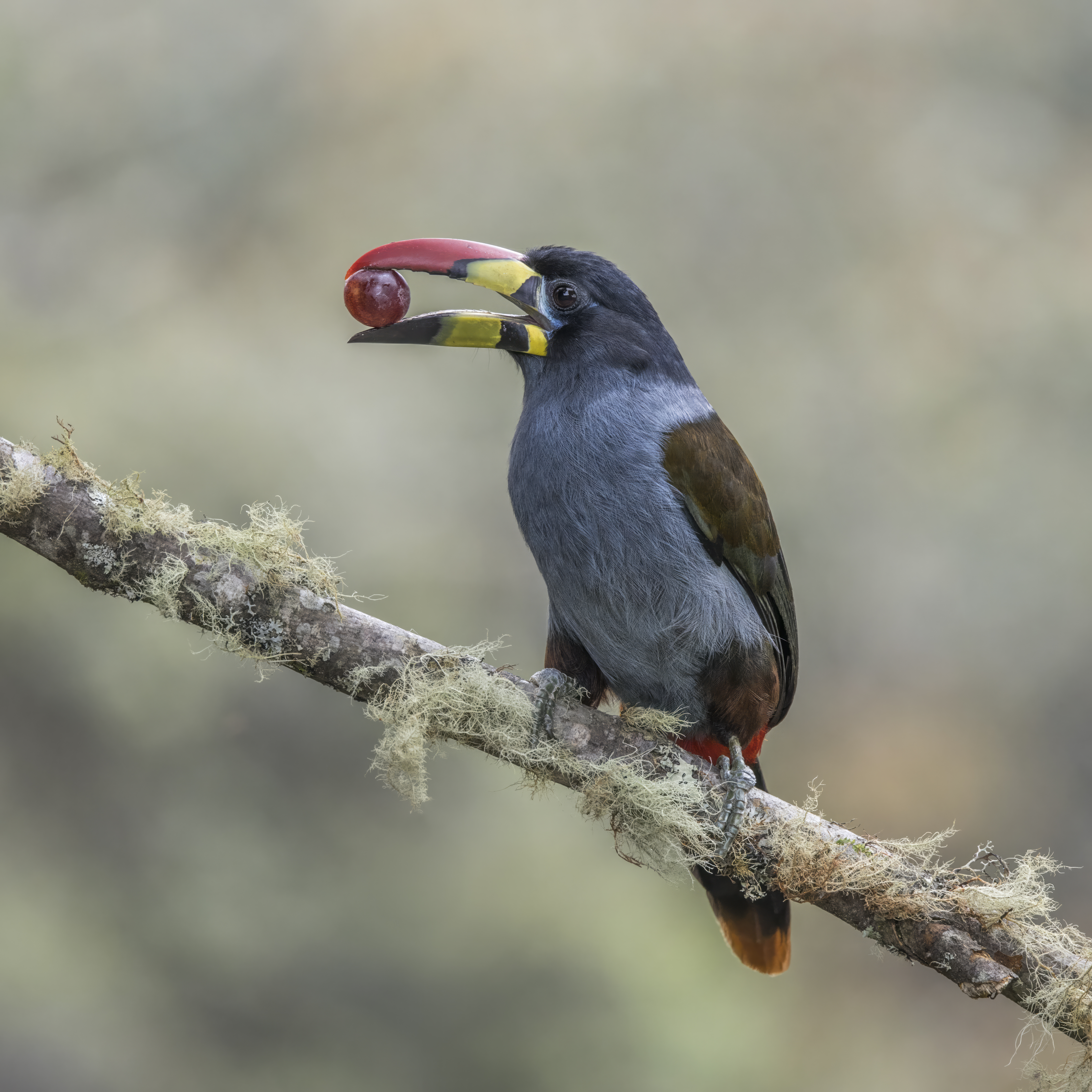
Feeding

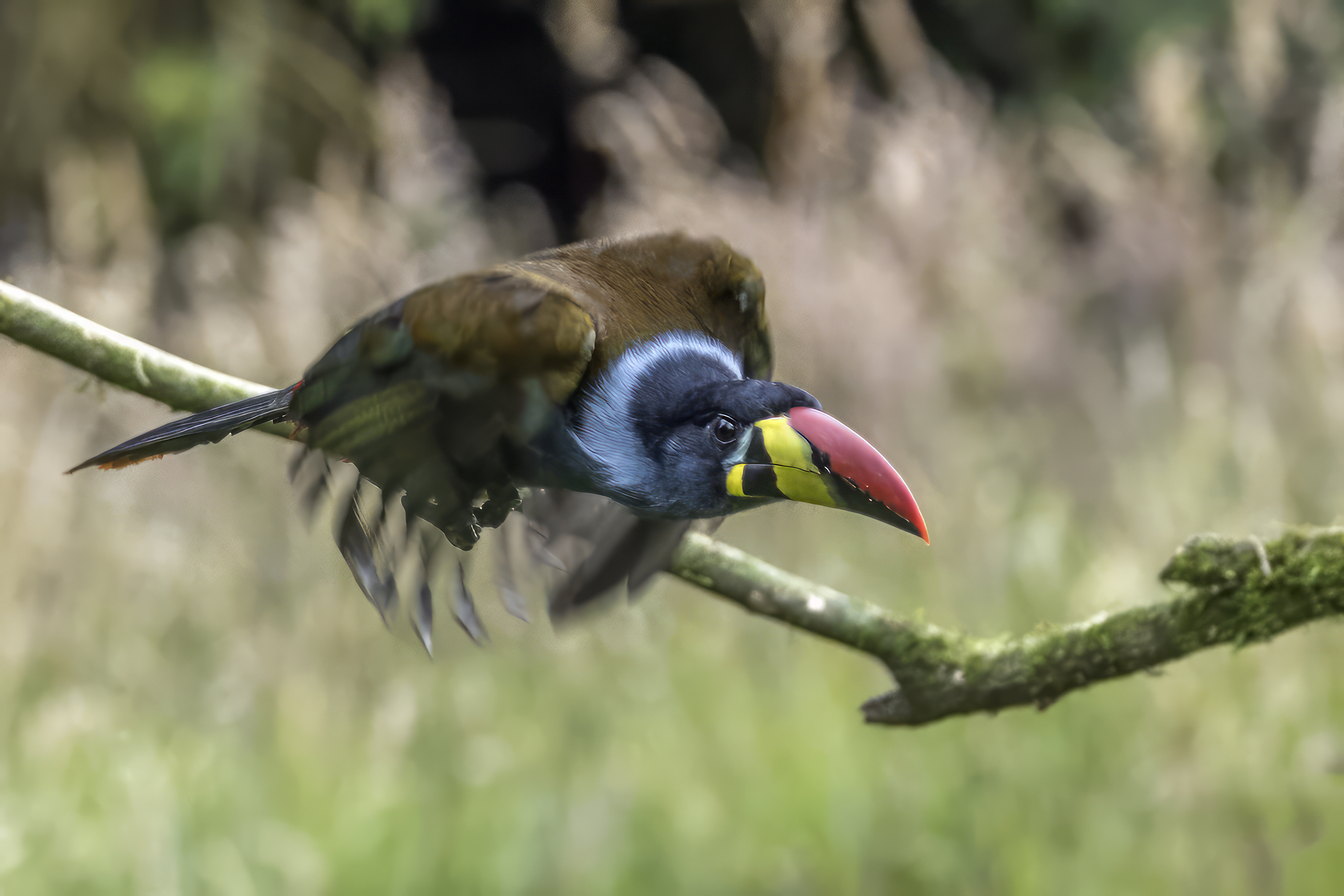
In flight

== Distribution and habitat ==
The nominate subspecies of grey-breasted mountain toucan is found from central and southern Colombia into eastern Ecuador. A. h. lateralis is found from eastern Ecuador south well into Peru. The species inhabits wet temperate montane forest including cloud, elfin, and secondary forest. In elevation it mostly ranges between 2,200 and 3,650 m (7,200 and 12,000 ft) though it is found as low as 1,500 m (4,900 ft) in Peru and 1,700 m (5,600 ft) in Ecuador.

== Behavior ==
=== Movement ===
The grey-breasted mountain toucan is not known to have a pattern of movement.

=== Feeding ===
The grey-breasted mountain toucan forages from near the ground up to the forest's canopy, singly, in pairs, or in small groups that might be extended families. It sometimes joins mixed-species foraging flocks. Its diet is known to include fruit and berries and is assumed to also include some vertebrates.

=== Breeding ===
The grey-breasted mountain toucan's breeding season spans from December to February in Colombia and from June or July to November in Ecuador and Peru. Nothing else is known about its breeding biology.

=== Vocal and non-vocal sounds ===
The grey-breasted mountain toucan's song is a "low 'gweeeeeeeat'". Its calls include "wek" notes made singly or in a series, and "kek" notes in alarm or aggression. Songs and calls can include "bill-whacking".

== Status ==
As of 8 March 2023, the IUCN has assessed the grey-breasted mountain toucan as being a least-concern species; it had previously been classified as near-threatened in 2016. It has a very large range (over 1,070,000 km²), and the population, while believed to be slowly declining, is still estimated between 25,000 and 77,000 mature individuals. The primary threat is habitat loss due to expanding agriculture, logging, and mining. Though it occurs in some protected areas and is thought to be locally common, "population fragmentation and inbreeding are possible problems".

These toucans also play an important ecological role as seed dispersers, especially in montane and cloud forest ecosystems, helping regenerate plant species over wide areas. Additionally, they host a species of feather louse, Austrophilopterus andigenae, which is specific to the genus Andigena.
