= Wan Long (businessman) =

Chinese businessman

- Born: 1940 (age 85–86)
- Occupation: Businessman
- Title: Chairman and CEO, WH Group

Wan Long (Chinese: 万隆; born 1940) is a Chinese billionaire businessman, the chairman and CEO of WH Group, the world's largest pork company, with subsidiaries including Smithfield Foods in the US.

== Early life ==
Wan Long was born in China.

== Career ==
In 1968 Wan Long started work for Luohe Meat Products Processing United Factory, and became the factory's general manager in 1984.

Wan Long is the chairman of WH Group, the world's largest pork company, with subsidiaries including Smithfield Foods in the US. Wan Long has been chairman since November 2010, and CEO since October 2013.

== Personal life ==
Wan Long lives in Luohe, China. He is a member of the Chinese Communist Party.
