= Joseph W. Luter III =

American meat processing executive (1939-2025)

Joseph W. Luter III (July 17, 1939 – August 28, 2025) was an American meat processing executive who was the chairman of Smithfield Foods, the world's largest hog producer and pork processor.

== Early life ==
Following in the steps of his grandfather, Joseph Luter Sr, who founded Smithfield Packing Company in 1936, and his father, Joseph Luter, Jr, who served as CEO until his death in 1962, Joseph W. Luter III became the third generation of his family to lead the company. Luter III was born in Smithfield, Virginia, to a United Methodist Christian family in 1939 and received his bachelor's degree from Wake Forest University in 1962. He majored in business administration.

== Career ==
Luter III started working at Smithfield during high school and college. He loaded trucks, worked the kill floor, sliced bacon, and performed various other tasks. He returned to work at Smithfield following his college graduation. His father died unexpectedly in 1962. Luter III then moved to take control of the company. He bought out the equity of non-family shareholders and became president of Smithfield at the age of 26.

In 1975, with the company in severe financial distress, Smithfield's board of directors asked that Luter III rejoin the company as chairman and CEO.

In 1995 Smithfield Corporation spilled more than twenty million gallons of lagoon waste into the New River in North Carolina. The spill remains the largest environmental disaster of its kind and was twice as big as Exxon Valdez spill in 1989. Smithfield committed over seven thousand Clean Water Act violations and received a $12.6 million fine, marking the largest civil penalty for pollution in US history at that time.

In 1999, Luter announced that Smithfield had become the largest pork producer in the world.

In 2004, Luter received a bonus of $6.6 million. In 2005, Luter received a bonus of $9.86 million due to Smithfield's performance during fiscal year 2005. In fiscal year 2005, Smithfield posted a profit of $296.6 on gross sales of $11.4 billion. Luter earned a salary of $850,000 that year.

Luter III announced in June 2006 that he would relinquish the title of chief executive officer of Smithfield Foods after serving in that position for 31 years to become non-executive chairman of the company. Larry Pope took over for Luter as the company's CEO. As chairman, Luter focused on acquisitions and broad, long-term strategy.

During Luter's 31 years leading Smithfield, the company achieved a 24 percent average annual rate of return on equity. Smithfield has beaten the S&P 500 index by at least 160 percent.

== Personal life and death ==
Luter's grandfather died in 1947.

The death of Luter's father in 1962 was both sudden and unexpected. In addition to heart problems, Luter II had diabetes and smoked about three packs of cigarettes daily. Luter III resented what he called his father's "workaholic" ways and resolved to live the life of a family man.

Luter's first child was a daughter named Laura. Luter's son, Joseph W. Luter IV was born on February 26, 1965. Luter IV was the family's second child. Luter's 3rd child is a daughter named Leigh. His youngest daughter is Erika from his second wife Karin Luter.

Luter died on August 28, 2025, at the age of 86.
