= Eckrich =

Prepared meat brand owned by Smithfield Foods

Eckrich is a prepared meat brand owned by Smithfield Foods, a subsidiary of China's WH Group. Eckrich sells smoked sausages, cold cuts, hot dogs, corn dogs, Vienna sausages, breakfast sausages and bacon under the Eckrich brand name.

== History ==
Eckrich was founded as a local meat market in Fort Wayne, Indiana, USA, in 1894 by Peter Eckrich, an immigrant from Waldsee, Germany. The firm expanded in the local market, becoming a wholesaler in 1907 and incorporating as Peter Eckrich and Sons in 1925. It closed its last retail operation in 1932 and operated exclusively as a wholesale meat vendor. In 1972, thirty years after Peter Eckrich had died, Beatrice Foods bought the firm and merged it into its Swift and Sons meat processing division in 1986 as Swift-Eckrich. Beatrice Foods' brands were sold off over the late 1980s, culminating in 1990 with the sale of many of its brands, including Eckrich, to ConAgra. ConAgra sold Eckrich to Smithfield Foods on October 2, 2006.

All 11 of Peter's children worked delivering meat for the company. Peter's brother Henry took over leadership of the business from Peter and was succeeded by Donald P. Eckrich, who served as president and chief operating officer of Beatrice Companies and president Eckrich. He was the grandson of the founder of the company.

== Marketing ==
Smithfield refreshed the design of Eckrich packaging for deli meats in 2020 by working with COHO Creative Agency out of Cincinnati, Ohio.
