= Daliu =

Daliu (大柳 unless otherwise noted) could refer to the following locations in China:

- Daliu, Anhui, town in Nanqiao District, Chuzhou
- Daliu, Henan (大刘镇), town in Yuanhui District, Luohe
- Daliu, Shandong, town in Ningjin County
- Daliu Township, Gansu, in Liangzhou District, Weiwu
- Daliu Township, Hubei, in Yunyang District, Shiyan, Hubei
