= Daliu, Henan =

Daliu 大刘镇
- Town
- Location in Henan
- Coordinates: 33°30′16″N 113°54′48″E
- Country: People's Republic of China
- Province: Henan
- Prefecture-level city: Luohe
- District: Yuanhui
- Elevation: 64 m (210 ft)
- Time zone: UTC+8 (China Standard)

Daliu (simplified Chinese: 大刘; traditional Chinese: 大劉; pinyin: Dàliú) is a town of Yuanhui District, in the southwestern suburbs of Luohe, Henan, People's Republic of China, located about 13 kilometres (8.1 mi) from downtown Luohe. As of 2011, it has 23 villages under its administration.

== See also ==
- List of township-level divisions of Henan
