= Smithfield Foods =

Chinese meat processing company

Smithfield Foods, Inc.
- Type: Public
- Traded as: Nasdaq: SFD
- Industry: Meat processing
- Founded: 1936; 90 years ago, as Smithfield Packing Company, Smithfield, Virginia, United States
- Founders: Joseph W. Luter, Sr. Joseph W. Luter, Jr.
- Headquarters: 200 Commerce Street, Smithfield, Virginia
- Area served: Worldwide
- Key people: Shane Smith (CEO)
- Products: Meat processing; Pork products
- Production output: As of 2006 raised 15 million pigs and produced six billion pounds of pork per year
- Brands: Cook's, Eckrich, Gwaltney, John Morrell, Krakus, and Smithfield, among others
- Revenue: ▼US$14.4 billion (2015)
- Operating income: ▼US$793.8 million (2015)
- Net income: ▼US$452.3 million (2015)
- Total assets: ▼US$9.9 billion (2015)
- Total equity: ▲US$4.8 billion (2015)
- Number of employees: 50,200 (2016)
- Parent: WH Group
- Website: www.smithfieldfoods.com

Smithfield Foods, Inc., is an American pork producer and food-processing company based in Smithfield, Virginia, and majority owned by Hong Kong based WH Group. Founded in 1936 as the Smithfield Packing Company by Joseph W. Luter and his son, the company is the largest pig and pork producer in the world. In addition to owning over 500 farms in the US, Smithfield contracts with another 2,000 independent farms around the country to raise Smithfield's pigs. Outside the US, the company has facilities in Mexico, Poland, Romania, Germany, Slovakia and the United Kingdom. Globally the company employed 50,200 in 2016 and reported an annual revenue of $14 billion. Its 973,000-square-foot meat-processing plant in Tar Heel, North Carolina, was said in 2000 to be the world's largest, slaughtering 32,000 pigs a day.

Then known as Shuanghui Group, WH Group purchased Smithfield Foods in 2013 for $4.72 billion. It was the largest Chinese acquisition of an American company to date. The acquisition of Smithfield's 146,000 acres of land made WH Group, headquartered in Luohe, Henan province, one of the largest overseas owners of American farmland. (Note: AgoPro (July 15, 2017): "In an overlooked part of the deal, Shuanghui also acquired more than 146,000 acres of farmland across the United States, worth more than $500 million, according to U.S. Department of Agriculture data. The deal made Shuanghui, now the WH Group Limited, into one of the biggest foreign owners of U.S. agricultural land, according to an analysis of that same data" [paragraph break removed].)

Smithfield Foods began its growth in 1981 with the purchase of Gwaltney of Smithfield, followed by the acquisition of nearly 40 companies between then and 2008, including Eckrich, Farmland Foods, John Morrell, Murphy Family Farms of North Carolina, Circle Four Farms of Utah, Premium Standard Farms, Nathan's Famous, and Healthy Ones.

The company was able to grow as a result of its highly industrialized pig production, confining thousands of pigs in large barns known as concentrated animal feeding operations, and controlling the animals' development from conception to packing.

As of 2006 Smithfield raised 15 million pigs a year and processed 27 million, producing over six billion pounds of pork and, in 2012, 4.7 billion gallons of manure. Killing 114,300 pigs a day, it was the top pig-slaughter operation in the United States in 2007; along with three other companies, it also slaughtered 56 percent of the cattle processed there until it sold its beef group in 2008. (Note: The other companies were American Foods Group, Cargill Meat Solutions and XL Beef.) The company has sold its products under several brand names, including Cook's, Eckrich, Gwaltney, John Morrell, Krakus, and Smithfield. Shane Smith has been the president and chief executive officer of Smithfield Foods since July 2021.

In 2025, roughly 12% of the company became publicly traded after a Nasdaq IPO and subsequent additional stock release.

== History ==
=== Founding and early history ===
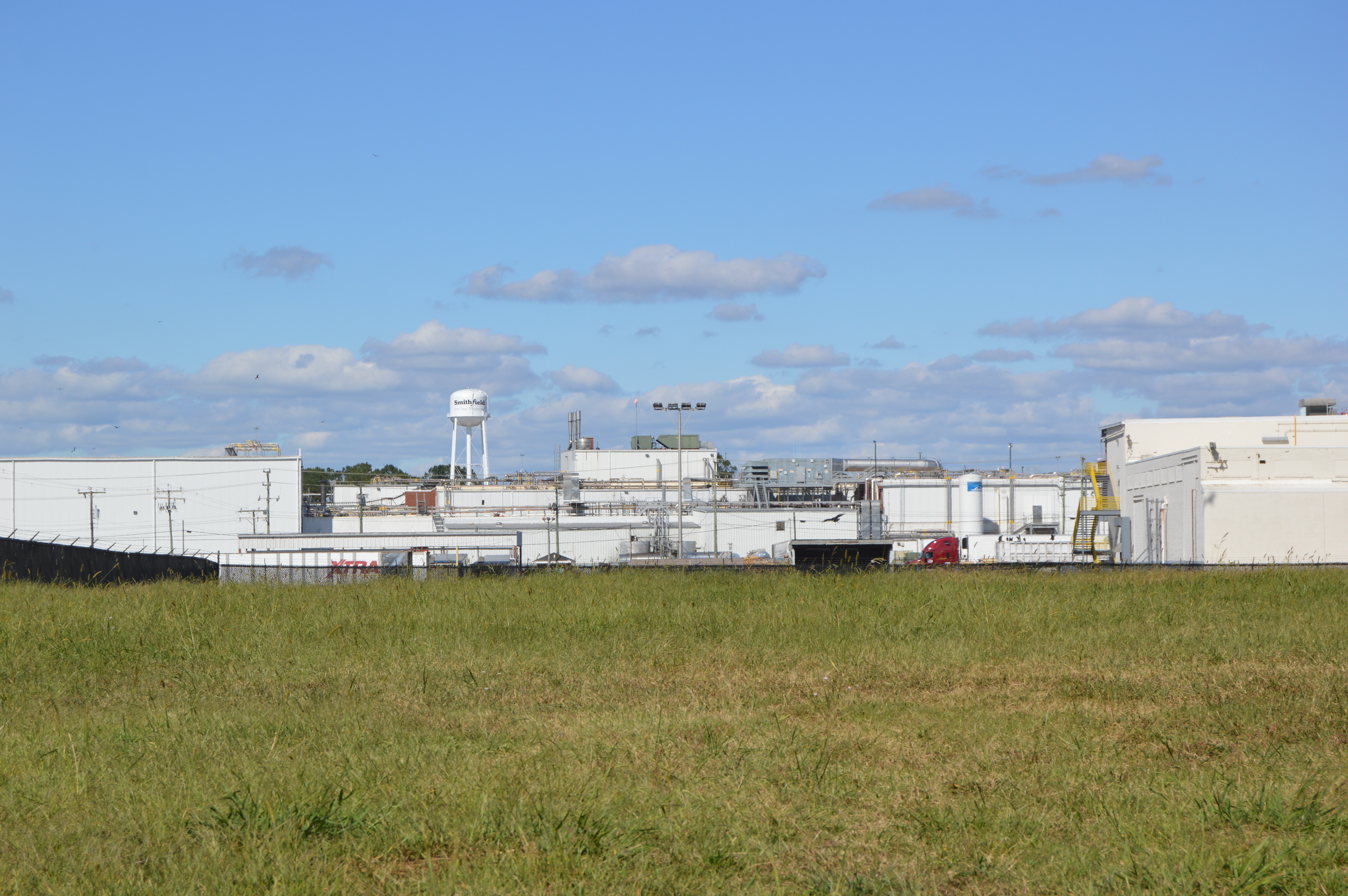
Smithfield processing plant in Smithfield, Virginia

The company traces its history to 1936, when Joseph W. Luter Sr. and his son, Joseph W. Luter Jr., opened the Smithfield Packing Company in Smithfield, Virginia. (Note: The name has no direct connection to Smithfield meat market in London; the town of Smithfield in Virginia was named after Captain Arthur Smith.) The men were working for the meatpacker P. D. Gwaltney, Jr. & Co. when they set up the company; Joseph W. Luter Sr. was a salesman and Joseph W. Luter Jr. the general manager. Financing for the new company came from Peter Pruden of Suffolk and John S. Martin of Richmond. In an interview in 2009, Joseph W. Luter III described how the Luters would buy 15 hog carcasses a day, cut them up, box them, and sell them to small stores in Newport News and Norfolk. They built the Smithfield Packing Company plant in 1946 on Highway 10. By 1959 they had a workforce of 650.

Joseph W. Luter Jr. served as Smithfield's chief executive officer (CEO) until his death in 1962. He owned 42 percent of the company when he died. His son, Joseph W. Luter III, was at Wake Forest University at the time and joined Smithfield that year. Working in sales, he borrowed enough to buy a further eight-and-a-half percent of the shares, and in 1966 he became chairman and CEO. He told Virginia Living that the company was killing around 3,000 hogs a day when he took over, and 5,000 by the time he left in January 1970, while the number of employees rose from 800 to 1,400. In July 1969 he sold Smithfield to Liberty Equities for $20 million; they asked him to stay on, but in January 1970 they fired him. From then until 1975 he developed a ski resort, Bryce Mountain, in Virginia.

At the recommendation of its banks, Smithfield re-hired Joseph W. Luter III as CEO in April 1975 when it found itself in financial difficulties. At the time, according to Luter, the company had a net worth of under $1 million, debt of $17 million, and losses of $2 million a year. He said it even lost money in December 1974—holiday-ham season—which was "like Budweiser losing money in July". Luter's restructuring of the company is credited with its improved performance. He remained as CEO until 2006 and as chairman until the company was sold to WH Group in 2013. His son, Joseph W. Luter IV, became an executive vice-president of Smithfield Foods in 2008 and president of the Smithfield Packing Company, by then the parent company's largest subsidiary. He resigned in October 2013. At that point his stock was valued at $21.1 million and Joseph W. Luter III's at $30 million.

=== Mergers and acquisitions (1981–2007) ===
Joseph W. Luter III began his expansion of Smithfield in 1981 with the purchase of its main competitor, Gwaltney of Smithfield, for $42 million. This was followed by the acquisition of almost 40 companies in the pork, beef, and livestock industries between 1981 and around 2008, including Esskay Meats/Schluderberg-Kurdle in Baltimore, Valley Dale in Roanoke, and Patrick Cudahy in Milwaukee in 1984.

In 1992, Smithfield opened the world's largest processing plant, a 973,000-square-foot facility in Tar Heel, North Carolina, which by 2000 could process 32,000 pigs a day. Smithfield purchased John Morrell & Co in Sioux Falls, South Dakota, in 1995, and Circle Four Farms in 1998. In 1999 it bought two of the largest pig producers in the United States: Carroll's Foods for around $500 million and Murphy Family Farms of North Carolina; the latter was at that point the largest producer. Smithfield settled the acquisition with 3.3 million shares of Smithfield Foods stock, $178 million in cash, and the assumption of about $216 million of debt.

Farmland Foods of Kansas City was added in 2003, as were Sara Lee's European Meats, ConAgra Foods Refrigerated Meats, Butterball (the poultry producer), Brown’s of Carolina, and Premium Standard Farms in 2007. Smithfield sold its 49 percent share in Butterball in 2008 for an estimated $175 million. In 2009 Smithfield was assessed a $900,000 penalty by the U.S. Justice Department to settle charges that the company had engaged in illegal merger activity during its takeover of Premium Standard Farms.

The acquisitions caused concern among regulators in the United States regarding the company's control of the food supply. After Smithfield's purchase of Murphy Family Farms in 1999, the Agriculture Department described it as "absurdly big". According to agricultural researchers Jill Hobbs and Linda Young, writing in 2001, the acquisitions constituted a "major structural change" in the hog industry in the United States, leaving Smithfield in control of 10–15 percent of the country's hog production. As of 2006 four companies—Smithfield, Tyson Foods, Swift & Company, and Cargill—were responsible for the production of 70 percent of pork in the United States.

=== 2013 purchase by Shuanghui Group ===
On May 29, 2013, WH Group, then known as Shuanghui Group and sometimes also Shineway Group, the largest meat producer in China, announced the purchase of Smithfield Foods for $4.72 billion, a sale first suggested in 2009. At the time of the deal, China was one of the US's largest pork importers, although it had 475 million pigs of its own, roughly 60 percent of the global total. According to Lynn Waltz, the Chinese ate 85.3 pounds of pork per person in 2012, compared to 59.3 in the US.

Shuanghui said it would list Smithfield on the Hong Kong Stock Exchange after completing the takeover. On September 6, 2013, the US government approved Shuanghui International Holding's purchase of Smithfield Food, Inc. The deal was valued at approximately $7.1 billion, which included debt. It was the largest stock acquisition by a Chinese company of an American company. The deal included Smithfield's 146,000 acres of land, which made WH Group one of the largest overseas owners of American farmland.

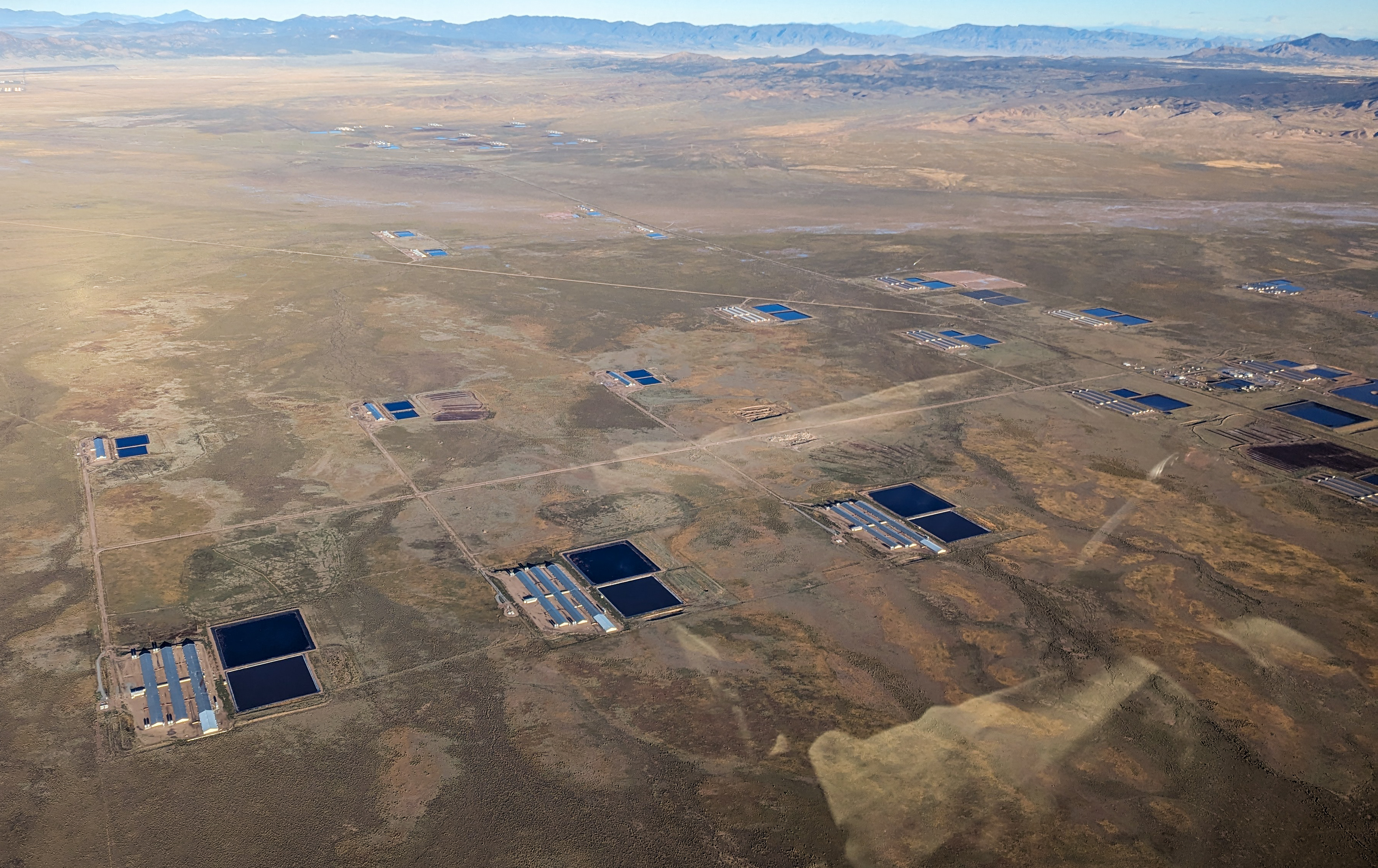
Smithfield/Circle Four pig farms in the Utah desert.

For decades Smithfield had run its acquisitions as independent operating companies, but in 2015 it set up the "One Smithfield" initiative to unify them; Circle Four Farms in Milford, Utah, for example, became Smithfield Hog Production-Rocky Mountain Region. Ken Sullivan said in 2017 that he saw the company's future as a "consumer-packaged goods business".

=== Mergers and acquisitions (2016-2019) ===
In 2016, Smithfield purchased the Californian pork processor Clougherty Packing PLC for $145 million, along with its Farmer John and Saag's Specialty Meats brands. Smithfield also acquired PFFJ (Pigs for Farmer John) LLC and three of its farms from Hormel Foods Corporation. In August 2017 Smithfield acquired Pini Polska, Hamburger Pini, and Royal Chicken of Poland, and in September that year it announced that it would purchase two Romanian packaged-meat suppliers, Elit and Vericom. In 2019 it acquired Maier Com in Romania.

=== Nasdaq IPO (2025) ===
On Jan 28, 2025, Smithfield became publicly traded with an initial public offering of 26 million shares and was listed on the Nasdaq, though WH Group retained 90% of the company stock. In September 2025, An additional 19.5 million shares were sold, reducing WH Group's majority ownership to 88% of the company.

=== Nathan's Famous (2026) ===
On January 21, 2026, Smithfield agreed to acquire hot dog brand Nathan's Famous in a deal worth $450 million. Smithfield already had an exclusive license to manufacture, distribute, market and sell Nathan's product, but the licenses had been set to expire in March 2032.

Successfully closing the acquisition will secure Smithfield’s rights to this iconic brand into perpetuity.

== Operations ==
=== Employees, brands ===
In 2016, Smithfield had 50,200 employees in the United States, Mexico and Europe, and an annual revenue of $14 billion. In 2012 it opened a restaurant, Taste of Smithfield, in Smithfield, Virginia, located in the same Main Street building as its retail store, The Genuine Smithfield Ham Shoppe. As of July 2017, the company's brands included Armour, Berlinki, Carando, Cook's, Curly's, Eckrich, Farmland, Gwaltney, Healthy Ones, John Morrell, Krakus, Kretschmar, Margherita, Morliny, Nathan's Famous, and Smithfield. In 2019 it introduced Pure Farmland, a plant-based brand of soy burgers and meatballs.

In early 2019 Smithfield re-branded its food-service business, Smithfield Farmland, as "Smithfield Culinary." The company created advisory boards composed of chefs, established partnerships with culinary schools, and engaged in substantial research and development to improve its products. Smithfield Culinary uses the Carando, Curly's, Eckrich, Farmland, Margherita, and Smithfield brand names.

=== Vertical integration, contract farms ===
Smithfield began buying hog-farming operations in 1990, making it a vertically integrated company. As a result, it was able to expand by over 1,000 percent between 1990 and 2005. Vertical integration allows Smithfield to control every stage of pig production, from conception and birth, to slaughter, processing and packing, a system known as "from squeal to meal" or "from birth to bacon".

The company contracted farmers who had moved out of tobacco farming, and sent them piglets between eight and ten weeks old to be brought to market weights on diets controlled by Smithfield. Smithfield retained ownership of the pigs. Only farmers able to handle thousands of pigs were contracted, which meant that smaller farms went out of business. In North Carolina, Smithfield's expansion mirrored hog farmers' decline; there were 667,000 hog farms there in 1980 and 67,000 in 2005. When the US government placed restrictions on the company, it moved into Eastern Europe. As a result, in Romania there were 477,030 hog farms in 2003 and 52,100 in 2007. There was a similar decline, by 56 percent between 1996 and 2008, in Poland.

Joseph W. Luter III said that vertical integration produces "high quality, consistent products with consistent genetics". The company obtained 2,000 pigs and the rights to their genetic lines from Britain's National Pig Development Company in 1990, and used them to create Smithfield Lean Generation Pork, which the American Heart Association certified for its low fat, salt, and cholesterol content. According to Luter, it was vertical integration that enabled this.

=== Housing and lagoons ===
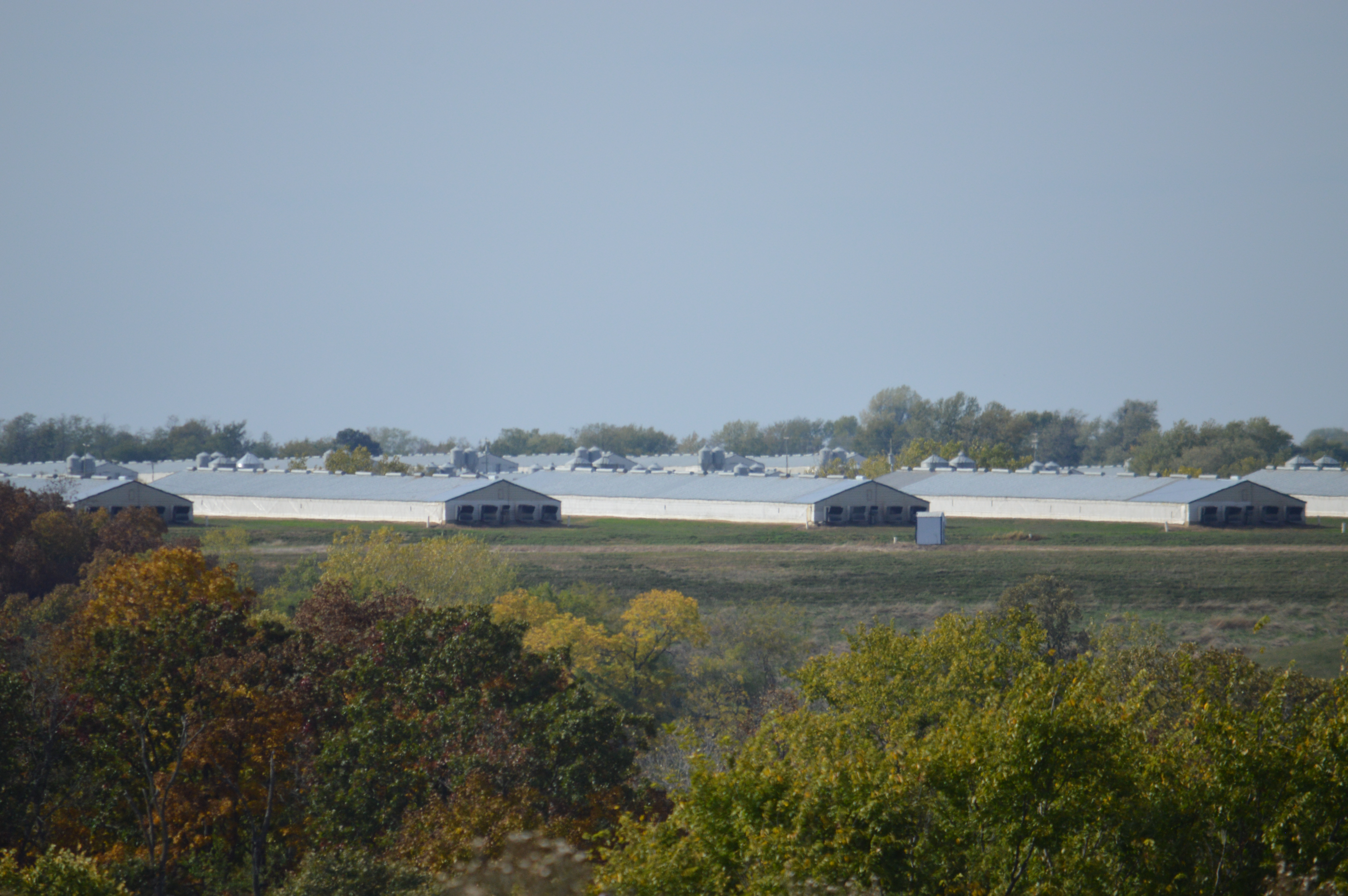
Smithfield CAFO, Unionville, Missouri, 2013

The pigs are housed together in their thousands in identical barns with metal roofs, known as Concentrated animal feeding operations (CAFOs). The floors of the buildings are slatted, allowing waste to be flushed into 30-feet-deep "open-air pits the size of two football fields", according to The Washington Post. These are referred to within the industry as anaerobic lagoons. They dispose of effluent at a low cost, but they require large areas and release odors and methane, a greenhouse gas.

Smithfield Foods states that the lagoons contain an impervious liner made to withstand leakage. According to Jeff Tietz in Rolling Stone, the waste—a mixture of excrement, urine, blood, afterbirths, stillborn pigs, drugs and other chemicals—overflows when it rains, and the liners can be punctured by rocks. Smithfield attributes the pink color of the waste to the health of the lagoons, and states that the color is "a sign of bacteria doing what it should be doing. It's indicative of lower odor and lower nutrient content." In 2018 it announced an "animal waste-to-energy" plan; the company said it would spend $125 million over ten years, along with Dominion Energy, to cover the lagoons in North Carolina, Utah and Virginia with "high-density plastic and digesters" to capture the methane gas and direct it into a local pipeline.

=== Pregnant sows ===
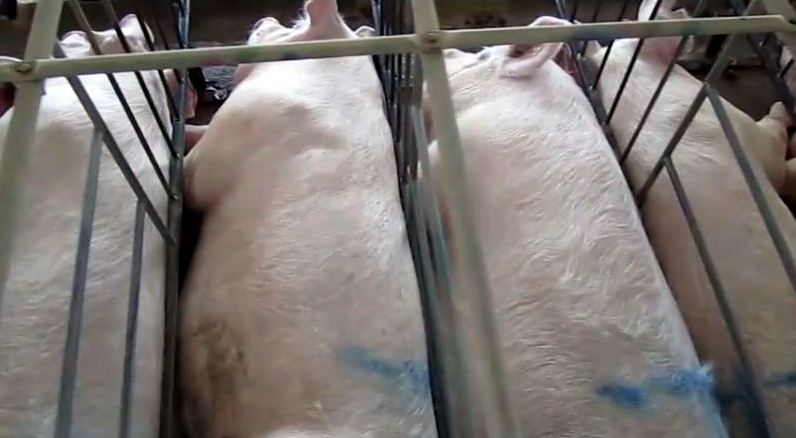
Sows used for breeding are confined in 7 ft x 2 ft gestation crates. This image was taken inside a Smithfield facility in Virginia in 2010.

Smithfield said in 2007 that it would phase out its use of gestation crates by 2017. Pregnant sows spend most of their lives in these stalls, which are too small to allow them to turn around. Pregnancies last about 115 days; the average life span of a sow in the United States is 4.2 litters. When they give birth, they are moved to a farrowing crate for three weeks, then artificially inseminated again and moved back to a gestation crate. The practice has been criticized by animal-welfare groups, supermarket chains, and McDonald's. Smithfield did not commit to requiring its contract farms to phase out the crates. Almost half the company's sows in the United States live on its roughly 2,000 contract farms.

In 2009, Smithfield said it would not meet the deadline because of the recession, but in 2011 it returned to its commitment, and to doing the same in Europe and Mexico by 2022. In January 2017 the company said that 87 percent of sows on company-owned farms were no longer in crates, and that it would require its contract farms to phase out crates by 2022. As of January 2018, on company-owned farms in the United States, Smithfield confines pregnant sows in gestation crates for six weeks during the impregnation process. When pregnancy is confirmed, they are moved to pens within a group-housing system for about 10 weeks, then to a farrowing crate, then back to a gestation crate to be impregnated again. It uses two forms of group housing: in one system, 30–40 sows are kept in a pen with access to individual gestation crates; in the other system, five or six sows are housed together in a pen. In July 2017 Direct Action Everywhere filmed the gestation crates at Smithfield's Circle Four Farms in Milford, Utah. The FBI subsequently raided two animal sanctuaries searching for two piglets removed by the activists. In January 2018 Smithfield released a video of the gestation and farrowing areas on one of its farms.

=== California closures ===
In 2020, Smithfield announced the closure of its plant in San Jose, California and the layoff of 139 workers from the site. Smithfield says it closed the plant due to the expiration of its lease and the decision of its landlord to sell. The local union that represented the plant's workers publicly questioned Smithfield's explanation.

In June 2022, Smithfield announced the closure of its plant in Vernon, California, by early 2023, and also stated that it is "exploring strategic options to exit its farms in Arizona and California". The company cited the high costs for the company to conduct business within the state of California.

=== Operations in Mexico ===
The earliest confirmed case of the H1N1 virus (swine flu) during the 2009 flu pandemic was in a five-year-old boy in La Gloria, Mexico, near several facilities operated by Granjas Carroll de Mexico, a Smithfield Foods subsidiary that processes 1.2 million pigs a year and employs 907 people. This, together with tension between the company and local community over Smithfield's environmental record, prompted several newspapers to link the outbreak to Smithfield's farming practices. According to The Washington Post, over 600 other residents of La Gloria became ill from a respiratory disease in March that year (later thought to be seasonal flu). The Post writes that health officials found no link between the farms and the H1N1 outbreak. Smithfield said that it had found no clinical signs of swine flu in its pigs or employees in Mexico, and had no reason to believe that the outbreak was connected to its Mexican facilities. The company said it routinely administers flu virus vaccine to its swine herds in Mexico and conducts monthly tests to detect the virus.

Residents alleged that the company regularly violates local environmental regulations. According to The Washington Post, local farmers had complained for years about headaches from the smell of the pig farms and said that wild dogs had been eating discarded pig carcasses. Smithfield was using biodigesters to convert dead pigs into renewable energy, but residents alleged that they regularly overflowed. Residents also feared that the waste stored in the lagoons would leak into the groundwater.

=== Exports ===
Since its acquisition by what would become WH Group, Smithfield has partially retooled its plants to export meat for consumption in China. This effort has been at least partially driven by the epidemic of swine fever in China that has resulted in massive reductions in that country's pig population and pork production. One plant in Smithfield, Virginia slaughters about 10,000 pigs per day for export. Smithfield's ramp up of exports to China has occurred in the face of headwinds in the form of 62% tariffs designed to protect China's hog farmers, who largely have small operations. Pork industry trade groups claim that the United States could export twice as much pork to China if the tariffs were lifted.

=== Production volume ===
As of 2006 Smithfield raised 15 million pigs a year and processed 27 million, producing over six billion pounds of pork and, in 2012, 4.7 billion gallons of manure. Killing 114,300 pigs a day, it was the top pig-slaughter operation in the United States in 2007; along with three other companies, it also slaughtered 56 percent of the cattle processed there until it sold its beef group in 2008. (Note: The other companies were American Foods Group, Cargill Meat Solutions and XL Beef.)

== Lawsuits ==
In 2010, a jury in Jackson County, Missouri, awarded 13 plaintiffs $825,000 each against a Smithfield subsidiary, Premium Standard, and two other plaintiffs $250,000 and $75,000. The plaintiffs argued that they were unable to enjoy their property because of the smell coming from the Smithfield facilities.

In 2017, in Wake County, North Carolina, nearly 500 residents sued a Smithfield subsidiary, Murphy-Brown, in 26 lawsuits, alleging nuisance and ill health caused by smells, open-air lagoons, and pig carcasses. Residents said their outdoor activities were limited as a consequence, and that they were unable to invite visitors to their homes. Smithfield said the complaints were without merit. On August 3, 2018, a federal jury awarded six North Carolina residents $470 million in damages against Murphy-Brown LLC. The verdict included $75 million each in punitive damages, plus $3–5 million in compensatory damages for loss of enjoyment in their properties. A state law capping punitive damages lowered that amount to $94 million. The plaintiffs had filed suit for "stench odor, truck noise and flies generated near their homes on Kinlaw Farm in Bladen County." In December 2018, several plaintiffs living near a Smithfield contract farm in Sampson County received compensatory damages ranging from $100 to $75,000. In March 2019, 10 plaintiffs were awarded $420,000 for nuisance by a jury in North Carolina.

State representatives of agriculture in North Carolina accused lawyers and their plaintiffs of attempting to put farmers out of business. Steve Troxler, North Carolina's agricultural commissioner, said the litigation could harm farm production across the country; he argued that legal abuse of the word nuisance is a mounting concern. As a result of the cases, legislators in Georgia, Nebraska, North Carolina, Oklahoma, Utah, and West Virginia passed or proposed changes to right-to-farm laws that reduce either the right to sue or potential damages.

In 2018, the Humane Society of the United States sued Smithfield for false and misleading advertising, alleging that Smithfield had continued to confine sows in gestation crates despite public claims to the contrary. A 2021 motion to dismiss the case from Smithfield was denied.

In 2024, Smithfield agreed to pay $2 million after violating child labor laws. Due to hazardous conditions, meat processing plants are prohibited from employing people under the age of 18 in the U.S. According to the Minnesota Department of Labor and Industry, Smithfield employed at least 11 people aged 14-17 between 2021 and 2023, all of whom performed hazardous work.

== Environment impact ==
=== Emissions ===
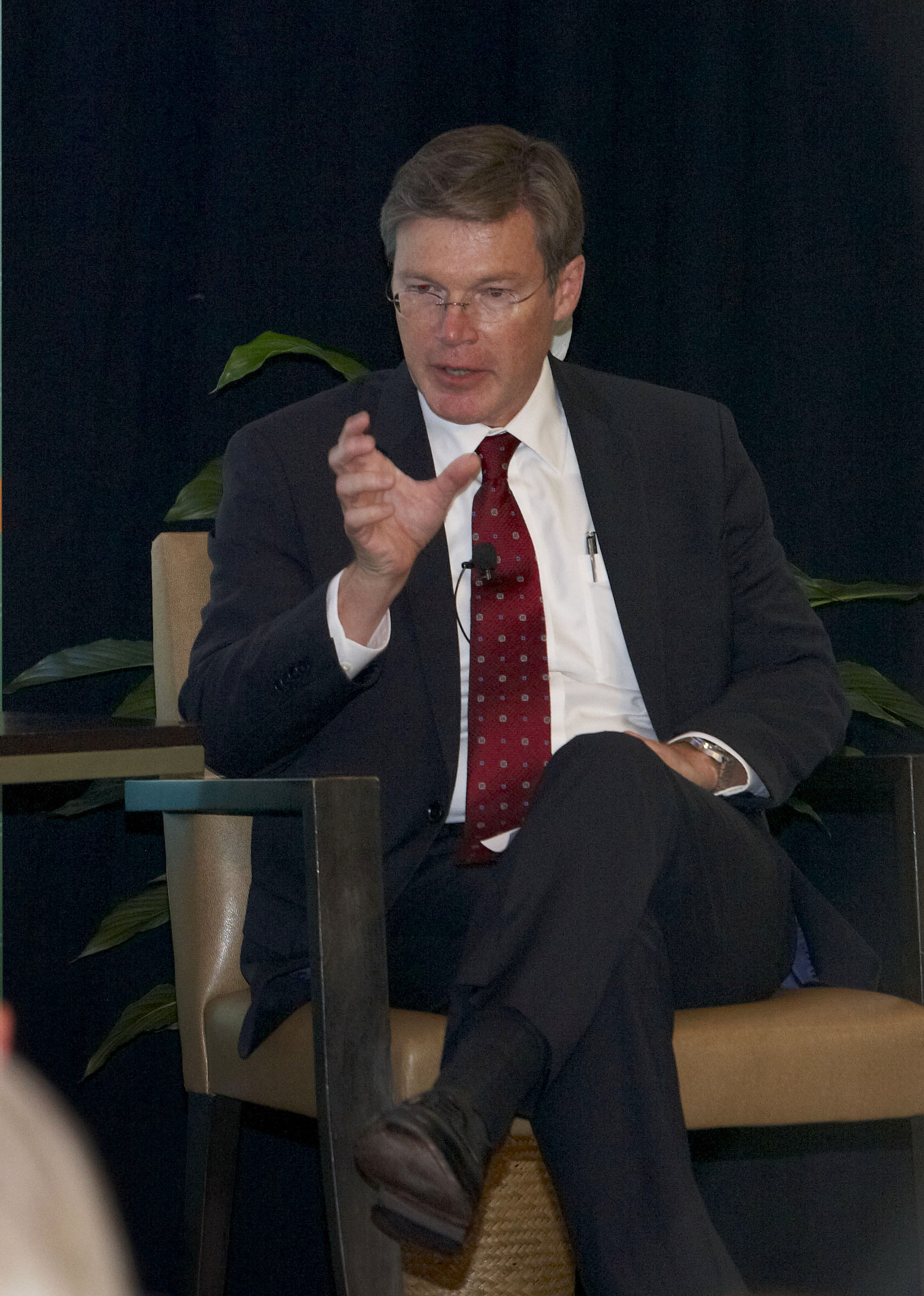
Stewart Leeth, Smithfield's chief sustainability officer, October 2017

Smithfield has come under criticism for the millions of gallons of untreated fecal matter it produces and stores in its lagoons. In 2012 it produced at least 4.7 billion gallons of manure in the United States; during their lifetimes, every pig will produce 1,100–1,300 liters. In a four-year period in North Carolina in the 1990s, 4.7 million gallons of hog fecal matter were released into the state's rivers. Workers and residents near Smithfield plants reported health problems and complained about the stench. The company was fined $12.6 million in 1997 by the Environmental Protection Agency (EPA) for 6,900 violations of the Clean Water Act after discharging illegal levels of slaughterhouse waste into the Pagan River in Virginia, the largest penalty levied under the Clean Water Act at that time. Its facilities in North Carolina came under scrutiny in 1999 when Hurricane Floyd flooded lagoons holding fecal matter; many of Smithfield's contract farms were accused of polluting the rivers. Smithfield reached a settlement in 2000 with the state of North Carolina, agreeing to pay the state $50 million over 25 years. (Note: The company agreed to donate $1.3 million to clean up; North Carolina State University would receive $15 million to research the treatment of pig waste; and the North Carolina Foundation for Soil and Water Conservation, Ducks Unlimited and the North Carolina Coastal Federation would receive grants.)

According to Ralph Deptolla, writing for Smithfield Foods, the company created new executive positions to monitor the environmental issues. In 2001 it created an environmental management system and the following year hired Dennis Treacy, director of the Virginia Department of Environmental Quality since 1998, as executive vice-president and chief sustainability officer. Treacy had previously been involved in enforcement efforts against Smithfield. In 2005 the company received ISO 14001 certification for its hog production and processing facilities in the US, with the exception of new acquisitions, and, in 2009, 14 plants in the US and 21 in Romania received certification. By 2011, 578 Smithfield facilities (95 percent of the company's global operations) were ISO 14001-certified. Smithfield subsidiary Murphy-Brown reached an agreement in 2006 with the Waterkeeper Alliance, once one of Smithfield's biggest critics, to enhance environmental protection at the Murphy-Brown's facilities in North Carolina. In 2009 the company said it had reduced its emissions since 2007, including its greenhouse-gas emissions by four percent; it attributed this to the divestiture of the beef group. In 2010 it released its ninth annual Corporate Social Responsibility report, and announced the creation of two sustainability committees.

In 2018, Smithfield Foods faced criticism for widely publicized failures of its hog waste lagoons, this time in the wake of Hurricane Florence. Despite statewide attempts to modernize facilities after Hurricane Floyd, more than a hundred and thirty of North Carolina's hog waste lagoons were compromised by floodwaters during Hurricane Florence. Thirty-three lagoons overflowed entirely, discharging their contents into the Cape Fear River watershed.

=== Packaging reduction ===
In 2009 Armour-Eckrich introduced smaller crescent-style packaging for its smoked sausages, which reduced the plastic film and corrugated cardboard the company used by over 840,000 pounds per year. In 2010 the John Morrell plant in Sioux Falls, South Dakota, reduced its use of plastic by 40,600 pounds a year, and Farmland Foods reduced the corrugated packaging entering waste streams by over five million pounds a year. Smithfield Packing used 17 percent less plastic for deli meat. The company also eliminated 20,000 pounds of corrugated material a year by using smaller boxes to transport chicken frankfurters to its largest customer.

=== Smithfield Renewables ===
Smithfield and Dominion Energy formed a joint venture, Align Renewable Natural Gas, in 2018 to make and distribute renewable natural gas from biological sources. The two sides they will invest $500 million by 2028. Align harvests methane from Smithfield's farms. It can be mixed and used entirely interchangeably with conventionally produced natural gas. Align will sell gas collected in Utah to California's low carbon fuel standard market. The two companies aspire to produce enough gas through Align to power 70,000 homes by 2028. Align's first project started serving 3,000 homes in Milford, Utah in 2019. Dominion allows its customers to buy blocks or renewable natural gas from Align in increments of $5 on a voluntary basis. One $5 increment is worth about half a dekatherm of energy.

In 2019, a joint venture, called Monarch Bioenergy, in Northern Missouri with Roeslein Alternative Energy constructed a "low-pressure natural gas transmission line" between a Smithfield farm and the city of Milan, Missouri. The construction was part of Smithfield Renewables' "manure-to-energy" project. In early 2020, Smithfield and Roeslein announced an additional $45 million investment in their joint venture. This investment will fund adding gas harvesting infrastructure to at least 85% of Smithfield's hog farms in Missouri. Smithfield also has other gas projects located in North Carolina, Utah, and Virginia.

Smithfield also has a deal with Duke Energy to harvest renewable natural gas from its farms in North Carolina. Smithfield, Duke, and OptimaBio have also partnered to harvest renewable natural gas from wastewater at Smithfield's plant in Bladen County, North Carolina. Gas is sent from the plant via Piedmont Natural Gas lines to Duke Energy power plants where it is used to generate electricity. This project cost $14 million.

=== Antibiotics ===
Concerns have been raised about Smithfield's use of low doses of antibiotics to promote the pigs' growth, in addition to using antibiotics as part of a treatment regimen. The concern was that the antibiotics were harmful to the animals and were contributing to the rise of antibiotic-resistant strains of bacteria. Smithfield said in 2005 that it would administer antibiotics only to animals who were sick themselves, or who were in close proximity to sick animals; however, in CAFOs all pigs are in close proximity to each other. The company introduced an antibiotic-free Pure Farms brand in 2017; it promoted the brand as free of antibiotics, artificial ingredients, hormones, and steroids.

== Animal welfare ==
=== 2006 CIWF investigation ===
In Poland, Smithfield Foods purchased former state farms for what its CEO said were "small dollars" and turned them into CAFOs using grants from the European Bank for Reconstruction and Development. Compassion in World Farming (CIWF) conducted an undercover investigation into Smithfield CAFOs there in 2006, and found sick and injured animals in the barns, and dead animals rotting. The CAFOs were run by Animex, a Smithfield subsidiary. In one barn, 26 pigs were reported to have died in a five-week period. The CIWF report said of a Smithfield lagoon in Boszkowo that the surrounding land was littered with waste including dangerous objects such as needles."

=== 2010 HSUS investigation ===
In December 2010 the Humane Society of the United States (HSUS) released an undercover video taken by one of its investigators inside a Smithfield Foods facility. The investigator had worked for a month at Murphy-Brown, a Smithfield subsidiary in Waverly, Virginia. The Associated Press (AP) reported that the investigator videotaped 1,000 sows living in gestation crates. According to the AP, the material shows a pig being pulled by the snout, shot in the head with a stun gun, and thrown into a bin while trying to wriggle free. The investigator said he saw sows biting their crates and bleeding; staff jabbing them to make them move; staff tossing piglets into carts; and piglets born prematurely in gestation crates falling through the slats into the manure pits.

In response, Smithfield stated that it does not tolerate abuse or otherwise improper care of animals. The company asked Temple Grandin, a professor of animal husbandry, to review the footage; she recommended an inspection by animal welfare expert Jennifer Woods. Smithfield announced on December 21 that it had fired two workers and their supervisor. At the company's invitation, the Virginia state veterinarian Richard Wilkes visited the facility on December 22. He praised Smithfield for its efforts to improve animal welfare and said he saw no signs of abuse. The Humane Society criticized the tour.

=== 2017 DxE investigation ===
A 2017 investigation by animal advocacy group Direct Action Everywhere (DxE) filmed "piles of dead baby pigs rotting in feces while others drank from bloody, mutilated nipples of sows” and found that some pigs were still being housed in gestation crates, despite claims by Smithfield that the practice had ceased.

== Labor relations ==
=== 1994–2008 union dispute ===
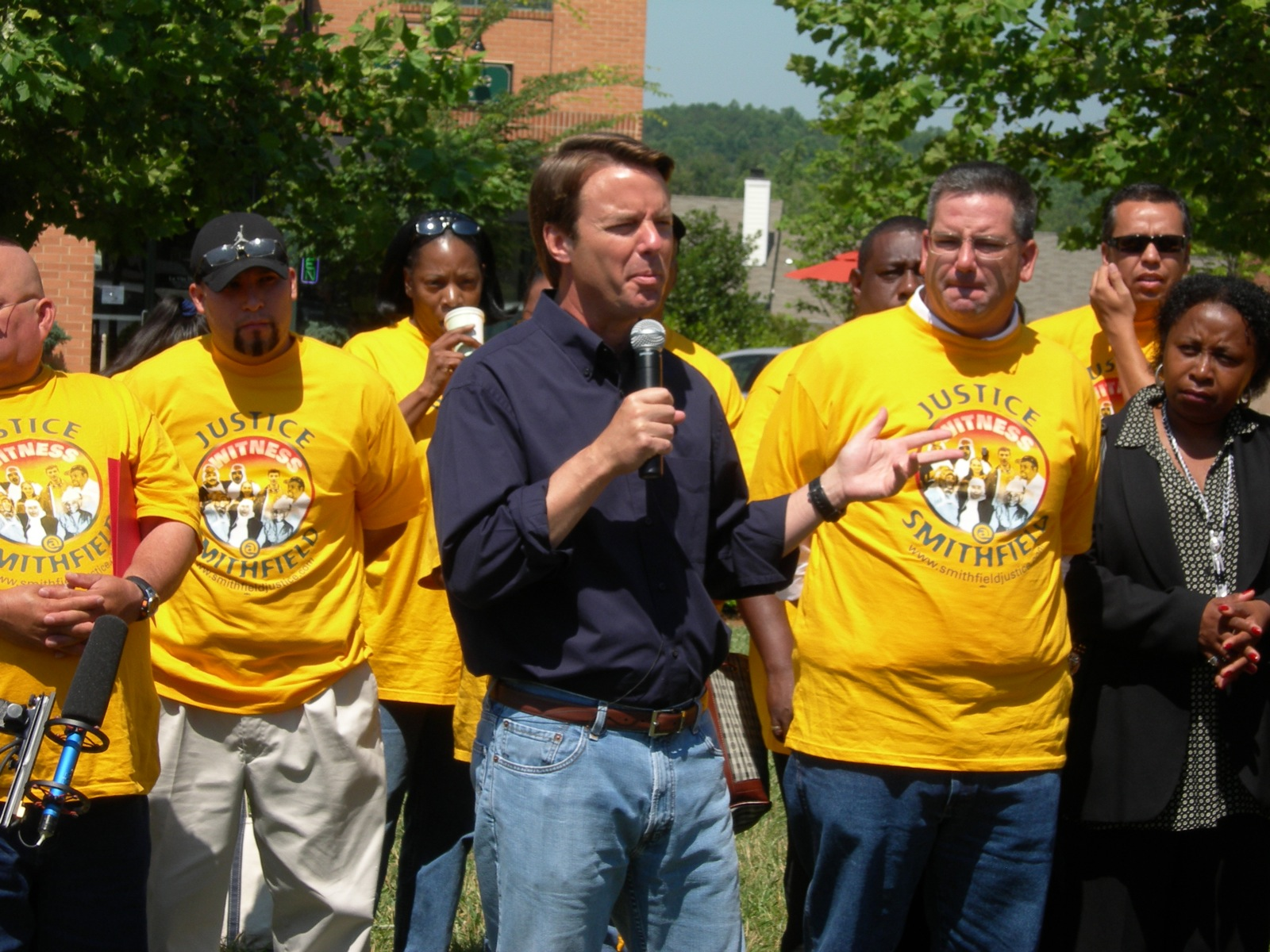
John Edwards meets Smithfield workers, Chapel Hill, North Carolina, June 2007.

The Smithfield Packing plant in Tar Heel, North Carolina, was the site of an almost 15-year dispute between the company and the United Food and Commercial Workers Union (UFCW), which had tried since 1994 to organize the plant's roughly 5,000 hourly workers. Workers voted against the union in 1994 and 1997, but the National Labor Relations Board (NLRB) alleged that unfair election conduct had occurred and ordered a new election. During the 1997 election the company is alleged to have fired workers who supported the union, stationed police at the plant gates, and threatened plant closures. In 2000, according to Human Rights Watch, Smithfield set up its own security force, with "special police" status under North Carolina law, and in 2003 arrested workers who supported the union.

Smithfield appealed the NLRB's ruling that the 1997 election was invalid, and, in 2006, the US Circuit Court of Appeals found in favor of the NLRB. After demonstrations, lockouts, and a shareholder meeting that was disrupted by shareholders supporting the union, the union called for a boycott of Smithfield products. In 2007 Smithfield countered by filing a federal RICO Act lawsuit against the union. The following year Smithfield and the union reached an agreement, under which the union agreed to suspend its boycott in return for the company dropping its RICO lawsuit and allowing another election. In December 2008, workers voted 2,041 to 1,879 in favor of joining the union.

=== Working conditions ===
Human Rights Watch (HRW) issued a 175-page report in 2005 documenting what it said were unsafe work conditions in the US meat and poultry industry, citing working conditions at Smithfield Foods as an example. In particular, the report said, workers make thousands of repetitive motions with knives during each shift, leading to lacerations and repetitive strain injuries. It also alleged that the workers' immigrant status may be exploited to prevent them from making complaints or forming unions. According to the report, the speed at which the pigs are killed and processed makes the job inherently dangerous for workers. A Smithfield manager testified in 1998, during an unfair labor practices trial, that at the Tar Heel plant in North Carolina it takes 5–10 minutes to slaughter and complete the process of "disassembly" of an animal, including draining, cleaning, and cleaving. One worker told HRW that the disassembly line moves so fast that there is no time to sharpen the knives, which means harder cuts have to be made, with the resultant injuries to workers. Similar criticism was made by other groups about Smithfield facilities in Poland and Romania. The American Meat Institute, a trade group of which Smithfield is a member, disputed the claims in the report. The United Food and Commercial Workers Union used the report in its appeals to consumers and civil rights groups during its dispute with Smithfield.

== Coronavirus outbreak ==
Smithfield closed numerous plants in order to help control the spread of the coronavirus. In mid-April 2020 the Smithfield plant in Sioux Falls, South Dakota became a "hotspot" for the COVID-19 pandemic. 300 of the plant's 3,700 employees tested positive. On April 12 the company announced the indefinite closure of the plant, which processes 4 to 5 percent of the pork products in the United States. Smithfield has stated that plant closures could cause a meat shortage. By April 14, 438 workers in Smithfield's Sioux Falls plant were confirmed to be infected with the coronavirus, with Sullivan stating, "We have to operate these processing plants even when we have COVID." On April 15, the company announced the closure of a plant in Cudahy, Wisconsin that makes bacon and sausage, and a plant in Martin City, Missouri that makes hams. Both plants were dependent on the Sioux Falls slaughterhouse. Employees in both facilities had tested positive for coronavirus, and by April 15, 28 workers at the plant in Cudahy had tested positive. By April 17, the Sioux Falls outbreak had grown to 777 cases, of whom 634 were Smithfield employees and 143 were other people who got infected after contact with a Smithfield employee. In 2020, Smithfield was cited by OSHA for violating workplace safety rules relevant to the pandemic. Smithfield says OSHA's accusations are without merit and is disputing the citation. By September 11, 2020, the Sioux Falls plant was tied to nearly 1,300 worker infections and four worker deaths.

On December 23, 2020, animal rights activist Matt Johnson of Direct Action Everywhere was interviewed on Fox Business posing as the CEO Smithfield Foods Dennis Organ and made claims that the factories were petri dishes for the coronavirus. In the interview, he said the meat industry could be "effectively bringing on the next pandemic, with CDC data showing that three of four infectious diseases come from animals and the conditions inside of our farms can sometimes be petri dishes for new diseases". Fox Business later had to issue an acknowledgement and retraction of the interview with host Maria Bartiromo, admitting they "were punked."

== Medical supplies ==
Smithfield is a supplier of heparin, which is extracted from pigs' intestines and used as a blood thinner, to the pharmaceutical industry. In 2017 the company opened a bioscience unit and joined a tissue engineering group funded by the United States Department of Defense to the tune of $80 million. According to Reuters, the group included Abbott Laboratories, Medtronic and United Therapeutics.

== Marketing ==
=== Sports sponsorships ===
In 2012, Smithfield announced a 15-race sponsorship with Richard Petty Motorsports (RPM) and driver Aric Almirola driving the No. 43 Ford Fusion in the NASCAR Sprint Cup Series. The sponsorship was increased to 30 races beginning in 2014. Smithfield rotates its brands on the car, featuring Smithfield, Eckrich, Farmland, Gwaltney, and Nathan's Famous. Smithfield and RPM parted ways in September 2017, allowing Smithfield to sponsor Stewart–Haas Racing in 2018.

As of 2023, Smithfield continues to sponsor Almirola in the NASCAR Cup Series with Stewart–Haas Racing. Almirola, who was set to retire from racing competition at the conclusion of the 2022 season, was coaxed by Smithfield to continue with his racing career and their partnership for 2023 and beyond in a multi-year agreement with the company.

== Meat substitutes ==
With a launch in 2019 Smithfield began marketing meat substitutes similar to those sold by Impossible Foods. Smithfield sells these products under the Pure Farmland brand.
