= Smithfield Hog Production Division =

- Type: Subsidiary
- Founded: 1988; 38 years ago
- Headquarters: Princeton, Missouri
- Parent: Smithfield Foods

Smithfield Hog Production Division, formerly Premium Standard Farms, Inc. (PSF), is a subsidiary of Smithfield Foods, Inc.

Premium Standard Farms was the second-largest pork producer and the sixth-largest processor in the United States until Smithfield Foods acquired it in 2007.

In 2013, Smithfield was acquired by Shuanghui International, China’s largest pork producer.

== History ==
PSF was founded in 1988 in Smithfield, Virginia, with the aim of creating a standardized method to produce premium pork. To accomplish this goal, the company decided to pursue full vertical integration—a first for pork producers in the United States.

In 2007, Smithfield acquired Premium Standard Farms for $800 million in cash, stock, and debt.

=== Locations ===
Smithfield Hog Production is headquartered in Princeton, Missouri and owns a pork processing plant located in Milan, Missouri. At one time, the company operated 132 company-owned farms and 109 contract farms in the state of Missouri, in addition to a leased farm and eight feed mills.

In July 2021, the company closed its original slaughter plant in Smithfield, Virginia.

In February 2023, Smithfield Foods closed its meatpacking plant in Vernon, California.

In May 2023, the company closed 37 sow farms in Missouri.

In October 2023 the company shut down a pork plant in Charlotte, North Carolina.

In December 2023 Smithfield ended contracts with 26 hog farms in Utah citing oversupply.

=== Methane harvesting ===
Valley View Farm, near Green Castle, Missouri, is a finishing site that houses more than 100,000 hogs at any given time. Half of the site's waste lagoons are covered to allow the harvesting of methane gas. Smithfield also has farms that engage in methane harvesting in Bethany and Princeton.

Smithfield built a connection from its farms in northern Missouri to the pipeline that supplies natural gas to Milan, Missouri. Fuel produced by Smithfield is mixed directly into Milan's gas supply. This project took 18 months.

Smithfield has formed a partnership with Roeslein Alternative Energy and Monarch Bioenergy, to help produce biogas. In early 2020, Smithfield and Roesleing Alternative Energy announced an additional $45 million investment in Monarch. This money will be used to expand Monarch's renewable natural gas capture and distribution to at least 85% of Smithfield's Missouri farms.

Smithfield's gas harvesting efforts are part of its stated goal of reducing its greenhouse gas footprint by 25%. This is using the company's 2010 emissions as the base for calculation.

== Litigation ==
In 2010, a Jackson County, Missouri, jury awarded seven neighboring farmers $11 million in damages for odors emanating from a 4,300 acre finishing farm near Berlin in Gentry County, Missouri where an estimated 200,000 hogs are processed annually. In 2006, six plaintiffs were awarded $4.6 million from the lawsuit (the largest in a hog farm odor issue), originally filed in 1999.
