= Yuanhui, Luohe =

Coordinates: 33°33′25″N 114°00′00″E

Yuanhui 源汇区
- District
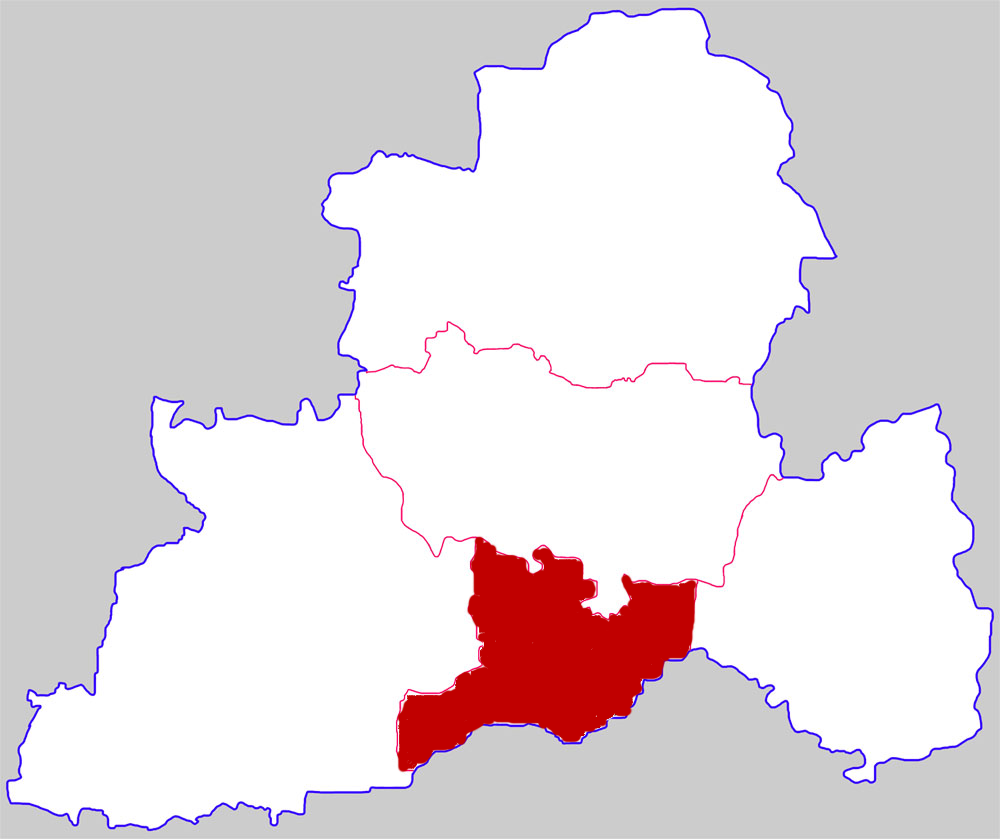
- Yuanhui in Luohe

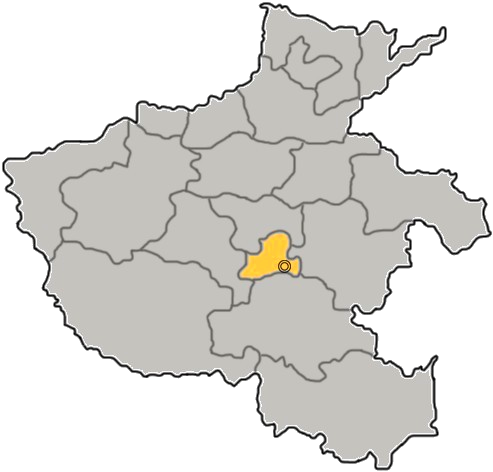
- Luohe in Henan
- Country: People's Republic of China
- Province: Henan
- Prefecture-level city: Luohe

Area
  - Total: 202 km^{2} (78 sq mi)

Population (2019)
  - Total: 344,200
  - Density: 1,700/km^{2} (4,410/sq mi)
- Time zone: UTC+8 (China Standard)
- Postal code: 462000

Yuanhui District (simplified Chinese: 源汇区; traditional Chinese: 源匯區; pinyin: Yuánhuì Qū) is a district of the city of Luohe, Henan province, China.

== Administrative divisions ==
As of 2012, this district is divided to 4 subdistricts, 1 town and 3 townships.

Subdistricts

- Ganhechen Subdistrict (干河陈街道)
- Laojie Subdistrict (老街街道)
- Malujie Subdistrict (马路街街道)
- Shunhejie Subdistrict (顺河街街道)

Towns

- Daliu (大刘镇)

Townships

- Kongzhongguo Township (空冢郭乡)
- Wenshi Township (问十乡)
- Yinyangzhao Township (阴阳赵乡)
