= Yancheng, Luohe =

Coordinates: 33°35′13″N 114°00′00″E

Yancheng 郾城区 Yencheng
- District
- Interactive map of Yancheng
- Country: People's Republic of China
- Province: Henan
- Prefecture-level city: Luohe

Area
  - Total: 413 km^{2} (159 sq mi)

Population (2019)
  - Total: 516,700
  - Density: 1,250/km^{2} (3,240/sq mi)
- Time zone: UTC+8 (China Standard)
- Postal code: 462300

Yancheng District (Chinese: 郾城区; pinyin: Yǎnchéng Qū) is a district of the city of Luohe, Henan province, China.

== Administrative divisions ==
As of 2012, this district is divided into 1 subdistrict, 6 towns and 2 townships.

Subdistricts

- Shabei Subdistrict (沙北街道)

Towns

- Chengguan (城关镇)
- Longcheng (龙城镇)
- Mengmiao (孟庙镇)
- Peicheng (裴城镇)
- Shangqiao (商桥镇)
- Xindian (新店镇)

Townships

- Heilongtan Township (黑龙潭乡)
- Liji Township (李集乡)
