= Farmland Industries =

American company

- Industry: Agricultural marketing cooperative
- Founded: 1929 (Union Oil Company); 1935 (Consumers Cooperative Association); 1966 (Farmland)
- Fate: Assets sold in 2002–04
- Successor: Smithfield Foods (foods); US Premium Beef (beef); Koch Industries (fertilizer)
- Headquarters: Kansas City, Missouri
- Number of employees: 16,000 (2002)
- Subsidiaries: Farmers Petroleum, Inc.; Farmland Foods, Inc.; Farmland Insurance Agency; Farmland National Beef Packing Co.; Pipeline Company; Farmland Securities Co.; Farmland Transportation, Inc.
- Website: www.farmlandfoods.com

Farmland Industries was the largest agricultural cooperative in North America when it eventually sold all of its assets in 2002–04. During its 74-year history, Farmland served its farmer membership as a diversified, integrated organization, playing a significant role in agricultural markets both domestically and worldwide.

The Farmland brand and its slogan "Good Food From the Heartland" are now owned by the Chinese-owned, Smithfield Foods, the largest pork producer and processor in the world, but Farmland Foods, Inc. operates independently and continues to market meat products under the "Farmland" brand. Farmland Foods serves both domestic and international markets and has revenues in excess of $3.5 billion annually.

== History ==
Historical logo of Consumers Cooperative Association

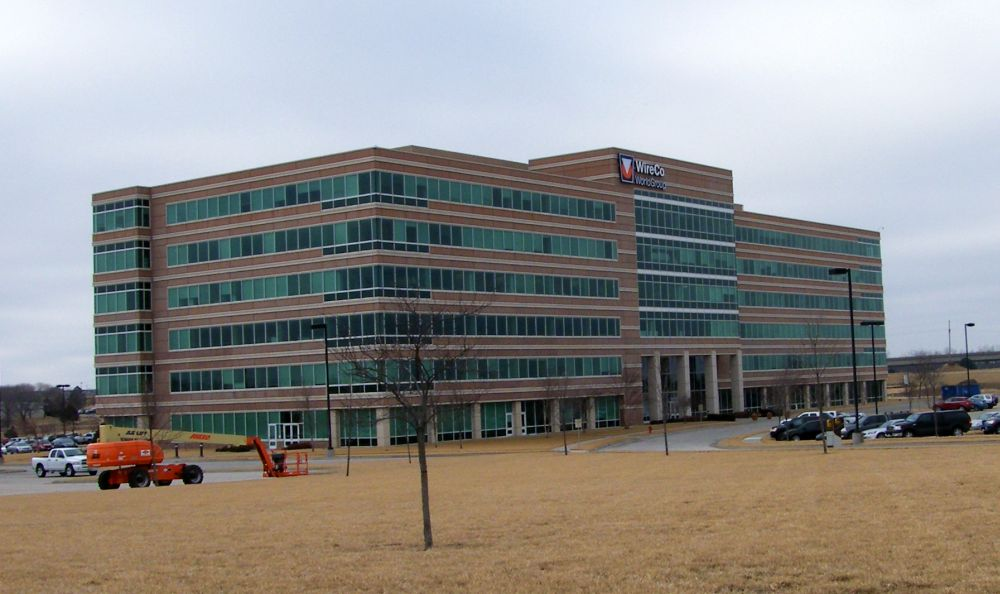
Farmland's former headquarters at 12200 N. Ambassador Drive by Kansas City International Airport in 2009

The cooperative was founded in 1929 by Howard A. Cowden as the Union Oil Company (as a successor to the Cowden Oil Company, which he founded the year before). In 1935 it took the name Consumers Cooperative Association (CCA), and in 1966 Farmland Industries, Inc.

At its peak, the organization was the leading agricultural cooperative in North America, owned by 1,700 farm cooperatives in the United States, Canada, and Mexico, which cooperatives were in turn owned by more than 600,000 farmer families. It had 16,000 employees in all 50 states and 90 countries. In 1977 it ranked #78 on the Fortune 100 company list. In 2001, its annual revenues were in excess of $11.8 billion. It was listed as one of Forbes' "most admired" companies. It ranked #170 on the Fortune List when the decision was made to sell the cooperative's assets.

The cooperative provided both agricultural supply and marketing services ranging from petroleum refining, fertilizer manufacture, feeds, shipping, crop production, livestock production, and refrigerated food sales and marketing. The company was a joint venture partner with a number of other companies, including: Archer Daniels Midland in grain storage, distribution, and marketing; Simplot in phosphate production; ConAgra in wheat marketing; Land O'Lakes in feed systems and crop nutrients; Cenex Harvest States in lubricants, propane, and refined fuels; Mississippi Chemical in nitrogen production and shipping (Trinidad and Tobago); Norsk Hydro in phosphate fertilizer production and marketing; Wilbur Ellis Company in crop protection product marketing and distribution; U.S. Premium Beef in beef packing; and Kansas State University in agricultural research. Farmland also owned Tradigrain, a group of international grain trading companies headquartered in Geneva, Switzerland. Tradigrain was a wholly owned subsidiary of Farmland and had branch offices in Buenos Aires, Argentina; Paris, France; Bremen, Germany; Budapest, Hungary; Almaty, Kazakhstan; Tokyo, Japan; Mexico City, Mexico; Moscow, Russia; Seoul, Korea; Kyiv, Ukraine; Mykolaiv, Ukraine, London, United Kingdom; and Akkala, Uzbekistan.

The company operated on a cooperative basis. The member/owners shared numerous commercial and financial benefits, including the sharing of costs for the processing and marketing of goods, competitive prices, and better supply and delivery capabilities. Embracing a farm-to-table mission, the cooperative essentially divided its activities between "inputs" and "outputs." On the input side, Farmland and its joint venture partners helped farmers in their production efforts by providing such items as fertilizers, insecticides and herbicides, animal feeds, and petroleum products. On the output side, Farmland added value to members' food and fiber products and marketed them throughout the world. A major part of the output strategy was to enhance the "Farmland" name and its trademarked phrase, "Proud to be farmer-owned". The cooperative also employed vertical integration as much as possible. With petroleum products, for instance, Farmland pumped crude oil from its own wells, refined it in its own facilities, and marketed the resulting products through its Ampride service stations. With hogs and beef, the cooperative was involved in the raising of the animals through feed, the slaughtering and packaging process, as well as marketing the meats under the "Farmland" brand.

Farmland's founder, Howard A. Cowden, was born in 1893 on a southwestern Missouri farm settled by his grandfather. Unlike other farms in his native Polk County, which averaged less than 100 acres in size, the Cowden farm, at 500 acres, was one of the largest. Cowden believed strongly that farmers were at an economic disadvantage in the marketplace: they faced high interest rates on mortgages, paid high transportation costs, and had virtually no leverage in the pricing of their commodities. He believed that farmers were faced with a "take-it-or-leave-it" proposition. Cowden became active in the organization of agricultural cooperatives and in 1929 formed a new firm, Union Oil Company, which he organized as a cooperative under Missouri statutes. Since Union Oil was intended as a regional enterprise, Cowden elected to establish headquarters in Kansas City, Missouri. By the end of its first year of operation, Union Oil served 22 local cooperatives and was supplied by Kanotex Corporation. Union Oil became the first cooperative in the country to run an oil-compounding plant. With the organization becoming involved in a wide range of products, it was decided in February 1935 to change the name to "Consumers Cooperative Association" (CCA). CCA had 259 local cooperatives as members and was generating more than $2 million in annual revenues. CCA established a grocery division in 1935, and soon the CO-OP label was applied to over 200 products. To support its petroleum business, CCA built a refinery in Phillipsburg, Kansas. When it became operational in 1939, the facility greatly increased the organization's income and led to a period of prosperity during the 1940s. CCA became involved in a variety of other areas, including the production of flour and feed, the manufacture of household and electrical appliances, and the development of insurance and finance associations. Of particular importance was the feed program, which in its first year generated more revenue than the grocery business did in its tenth year. Another highly profitable business for CAA was fertilizer, which farmers began to use at an accelerated rate. By 1958, CCA topped $100 million in annual revenues, ranked 327th among the Fortune 500, and was one of the largest cooperatives in America. In many ways it was considered an industrial powerhouse, controlling a wide range of assets: oil wells, pipelines, refineries, grease and paint factories, feed mills, fertilizer works, warehouses, and a fleet of trucks. Petroleum products continued to dominate the cooperative's business, accounting for 70 percent of revenues, but that percentage would dip below 50 percent over the next few years as fertilizer became an increasingly more important revenue stream. The emphasis of CCA turned to the farm supply and service field, making the use of the word "consumer" in its title less appropriate. The organization also faced mounting pressure to better serve farmers by engaging in the marketing of agricultural products, an area which CCA had intentionally avoided. In 1958, the CCA Board agreed to become involved in marketing as opportunities might arise. A year later the cooperative purchased the Crawford County Packing Company in Denison, Iowa, and entered the pork processing business, ultimately acquiring food manufacturing facilities throughout the Midwest. During the course of developing its food processing capability, the cooperative sought to improve operating efficiencies, marketing strategies, and the relationship with facility employees.

Throughout the latter part of the century, Farmland continued to grow and diversify, turning to international markets, contracting to sell wheat, fertilizer, and food products overseas, and forming joint ventures with foreign partners. The stated ambition was to gain a presence in "every sector of the global food chain". During this period, Farmland became a North American and international cooperative, expanding its employee base to include executive and administrative functions. The management remained committed to Farmland's original values, seeing the organization as representing the interests of its farmer members. Revenues grew steadily, increasing from $3.4 billion in fiscal 1992 to more than $10.7 billion in 1999.

== Growth and the sale of assets ==
Throughout the 1990s, the company continued to grow, serving markets worldwide. Its activities became increasingly complex and extensive. In 1998, the company's $2.8 billion asset base included nitrogen complexes in the U.S. and abroad; the second-largest petroleum refinery in the Midwest; phosphate mining operations; grain storage capacity of 145 million bushels; diverse feed manufacturing entities that included feed mills, spray dry plants and commodity sheds; 12 meat plants; and a transportation fleet of more than 4,400 rail cars, 1,060 over-the-road trucks and 1,850 trailers, and interest in 100 dry cargo barges and several ocean-vessels. During this time, the company continued its mission to benefit the independent family farmer and farming interests, stating its mission "to be a global, consumer-driven, producer-owned 'farm-to-table' cooperative system."

In 1997, Farmland entered into a joint venture with Mississippi Chemical Corp. to build an ammonia plant in Trinidad designed to lower production cost of nitrogen fertilizers by utilizing Trinidad's plentiful and lower-cost natural gas supply. Another expansion occurred at the company's Rock Springs, Wyoming SF Phosphates plant, a joint venture with J.R. Simplot Company. Other efforts included a focus on precision farming through programs such as Resource 21, a remote sensing project with Boeing and GDE, AgInfo, a GIS software system offered through Agronomy Services Bureau; and Integrated Crop Management (ICM), a precision farming data management tool. These efforts were designed to stay at the forefront of technologies such as remote sensing, variable rate fertilization, grid sampling, yield mapping and global positioning and geographic information systems. The cooperative built a highly innovative coke-to-nitrogen fertilizer plant adjacent to its petroleum refinery operation in Coffeyville, Kansas. The plant allowed the cooperative to convert petroleum coke—a waste product from the petroleum division—into ammonia that could be used for fertilizer. This project was lauded for its environmental impact.

In June 1999, the company broke ground for a 280,000-square-foot (26,000 m^{2}) headquarters on a 40-acre (160,000 m^{2}) campus just east of Kansas City International Airport to consolidate the offices for 1,000 employees. The building was completed in 2001.

Throughout the 1990s, Farmland was a highly successful venture, serving the needs of its members and participating as an integral part of North American farming. During this time, however, its financial structure became highly leveraged. In 2002, the company faced a liquidity crisis resulting from fluctuations in commodity prices and increased operational and capital costs, as well as the tightening of credit terms from suppliers and increased demands from its bondholders. To achieve stability and to obtain time to explore refinancing alternatives, the cooperative filed for Chapter 11 in May 2002 (in its filing it listed $2.7 billion in assets and $1.9 billion in debt). Although the cooperative continued to operate as a going concern, the reorganization process ultimately resulted in the decision to sell virtually all of the company's assets, including the following subsidiaries: Farmland Foods, Inc., the pork processing division to Smithfield Foods for $367M; Farmland National Beef Packing Company to US Premium Beef for $232M; and the fertilizer production division to Koch Industries. The company's refinery and coke-to-nitrogen fertilizer plant were sold to a hedge fund. It has been noted that the value of Farmland assets far exceeded the amount of its indebtedness. The "Farmland" brand continues to be widely recognized in the food industry.

The Co-op Retirement Plan, which provides a final salary defined benefit retirement plan for member cooperatives' employees, was administered by Farmland. A non-profit, United Benefits Group, was incorporated to take over this service, from 2003.

The reorganization process resulted in the sale of the cooperative's assets, with all creditors completely (over 100 cents on the dollar) repaid by 2006. According to JPMorgan, the liquidating trustee, unsecured creditors received $891 million, which was 104 cents on the dollar, the maximum allowed by law, and allows for interest.

Before the liquidation was completed, it was accepted that no assets remained to be distributed to the members, the local cooperatives, who had to write off the loss of their equity account balances. A 2004 study in Oklahoma suggested that the most significant effects on cooperatives related to farmer connections and lost business relationships, and the direct financial impact of the write off was low.
