= Smithfield Packing Company =

American-based meat product packer

- Formerly: Luter Packing Company
- Company type: Subsidiary
- Founded: September 16, 1936; 88 years ago
- Founders: Joe Luter; Joe Luter II
- Headquarters: Smithfield, Virginia
- Parent: Smithfield Foods

The Smithfield Packing Company sells meat products such as ham, ground pork, pork chops, bacon, and lunch meat. It sells its products worldwide. The company was founded in 1936. It is based in Smithfield, Virginia. It is part of Smithfield Foods which is in turn a subsidiary of WH Group.

== History ==
The firm was founded on September 16, 1936, in Smithfield, Virginia and was originally known as the Luter Packing Company. Joe Luter and his son Joe Luter II, both experienced meatpackers, founded the firm together. The senior Luter was born in Ivor town in Southampton County, Virginia in 1879. Joe Luter's grandson, Joe Luter III, would go on to lead the company decades later.

Smithfield, Virginia was known for its pork products as early as the 18th Century. Isle of Wight bacon and Smithfield ham were its most famous products. In 1926, a law was passed, making it illegal to refer to any pork not processed within Smithfield's boundaries as "Smithfield ham." Luter and his son started curing Smithfield hams and selling them to small stores located nearby.

Smithfield Packing opened a large facility in Tar Heel, North Carolina in 1992. The company offered thousands of workers in impoverished Bladen County hourly pay double the federal minimum wage. As of 2018, the size of the Tar Heel plant had about 973,000 square feet in floor area. As of early 2020, Smithfield Packing had made more than $130,000,000 in recent investments in Bladen County.

As of 2012, Smithfield Packing employed about 12,500 people and had sales of about $4 billion.

In November 2012, Smithfield Packing began the process of shutting down a plant in Portsmouth, Virginia that made hot dogs and deli meats and moving it to Kinston, North Carolina. This closure affected about 425 workers. Transfers to other plants were offered to some workers. The company negotiated with the plant's union regarding the terms of any chances for further employment. The company provided proper notice under the Worker Adjustment and Retraining Notification Act and referred affected workers to state agencies for assistance. The Portsmouth plant was designed and built in the 1970s and could not be adapted to the needs of the modern meat-packing industry.

In March 2013, Smithfield Packing announced the closure of a bone-in ham plant located in Landover, Maryland. The company said it would attempt to employ the affected workers at other sites.

== See also ==
- An American Trilogy (book)
