= Right-to-farm laws =

United States state-level laws

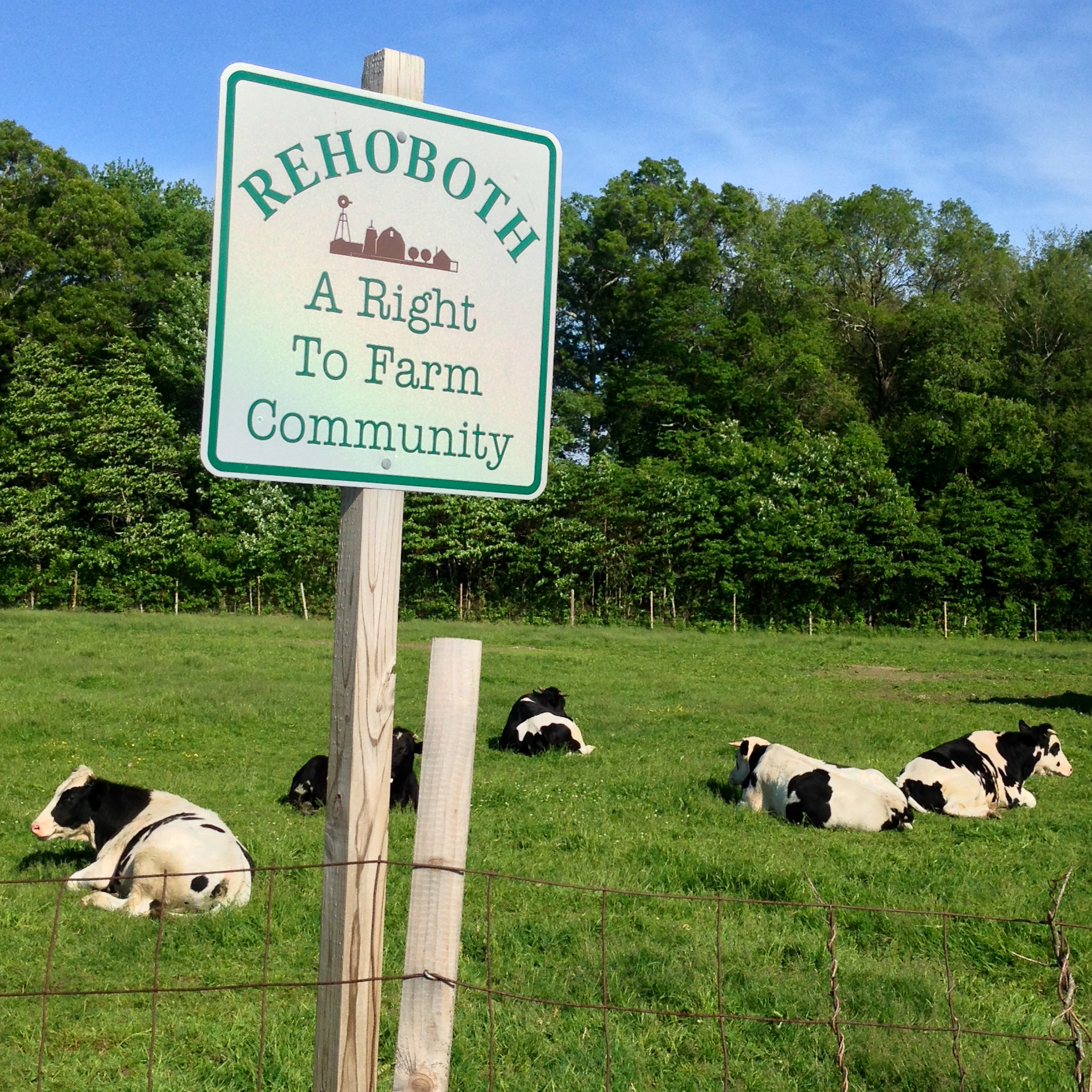
A posted sign in Rehoboth, Massachusetts declares the town as a Right to Farm Community.

All fifty U.S. states have enacted Right-to-farm laws that aim to protect agricultural operations from nuisance lawsuits, as farmers practice accepted standards. Agriculture nuisance lawsuits may be initiated by neighboring property owners or the general public in response to complaints about noise, odor, visual clutter, and dangerous structures associated with the agricultural operation.

These laws were enacted in the 1970s and 1980s in response to reduced availability of farmland and legal challenges from private and public nuisance action. The Right-to-farm intends to reduce the risk of legislation disruption of standard farming practices. Unlike traditional farmland preservation policies, which focus on land conservation, Right-to-farm laws support farm viability through protections of the operation and practices.

State and local governments now regulate the legal code that governs agricultural operations. Local laws are often more specific and clearly defined, reflecting a community's commitment to supporting agriculture. In both cases, these codes outline the scope of protection for farmers against nuisance lawsuits and regulations.

== History ==
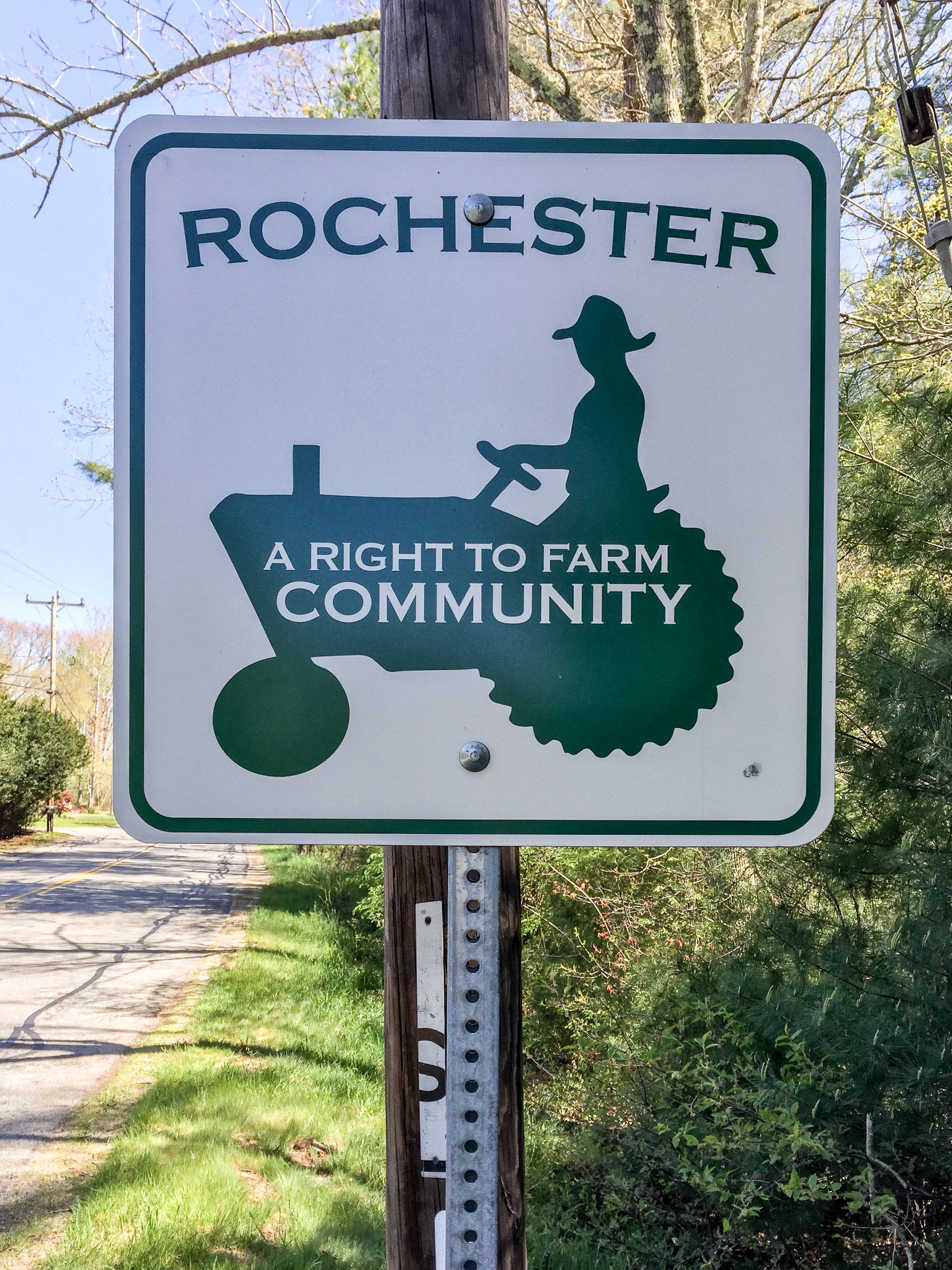
Rochester, Massachusetts adopted a Right to Farm law in 2012

Increased suburban developments on agricultural land in the 1970s and 1980s established the importance of a Right-to-farm. A national transformation from a rural society into suburbia introduced nuisance claims filed against existing farmers by new residents. Noise, odor, and dirt generated by the operations led to these conflicts. Before enacting the Right-to-farm laws, the general nuisance Common Law settled these conflicts. As litigation action came about, defending these challenges placed a financial burden on farmers, threatening their operations and industry. Additionally, this Common Law was not adopted and applied consistently across agricultural communities, bringing forth even larger cases and challenges. The United States Department of Agriculture and the President's Council of Environmental Quality developed the Right-to-farm law to protect small-scale farmers from said lawsuits and preserve open space and agricultural integrity.

In 1979, Massachusetts became the first state to pass a Right-to-farm law. In the same year, Pilesgrove Township, New Jersey enacted the state's Right-to-farm ordinance, protecting farming as a "natural right hereby ordained to exist as a permitted use everywhere in the Township of Pilesgrove." All fifty states had enacted similar codes by the twenty-first century, though the scope and specifics of these protections can vary.

== Understanding the law ==
Right-to-farm laws vary across the United States, but the core purpose is to strengthen the legitimacy of agricultural operations, protect farmers from undue outside interference, and resolve public and private land use conflicts. Right-to-farm laws are, in part, a modification of the Common Law doctrine of nuisance, as discussed above. Under Common Law, nuisances are categorized as either public or private; a public nuisance impairs the health, safety, morale, or comfort of the general public, whereas, a private nuisance involves an unreasonable interference with an individual's use and enjoyment of their land.

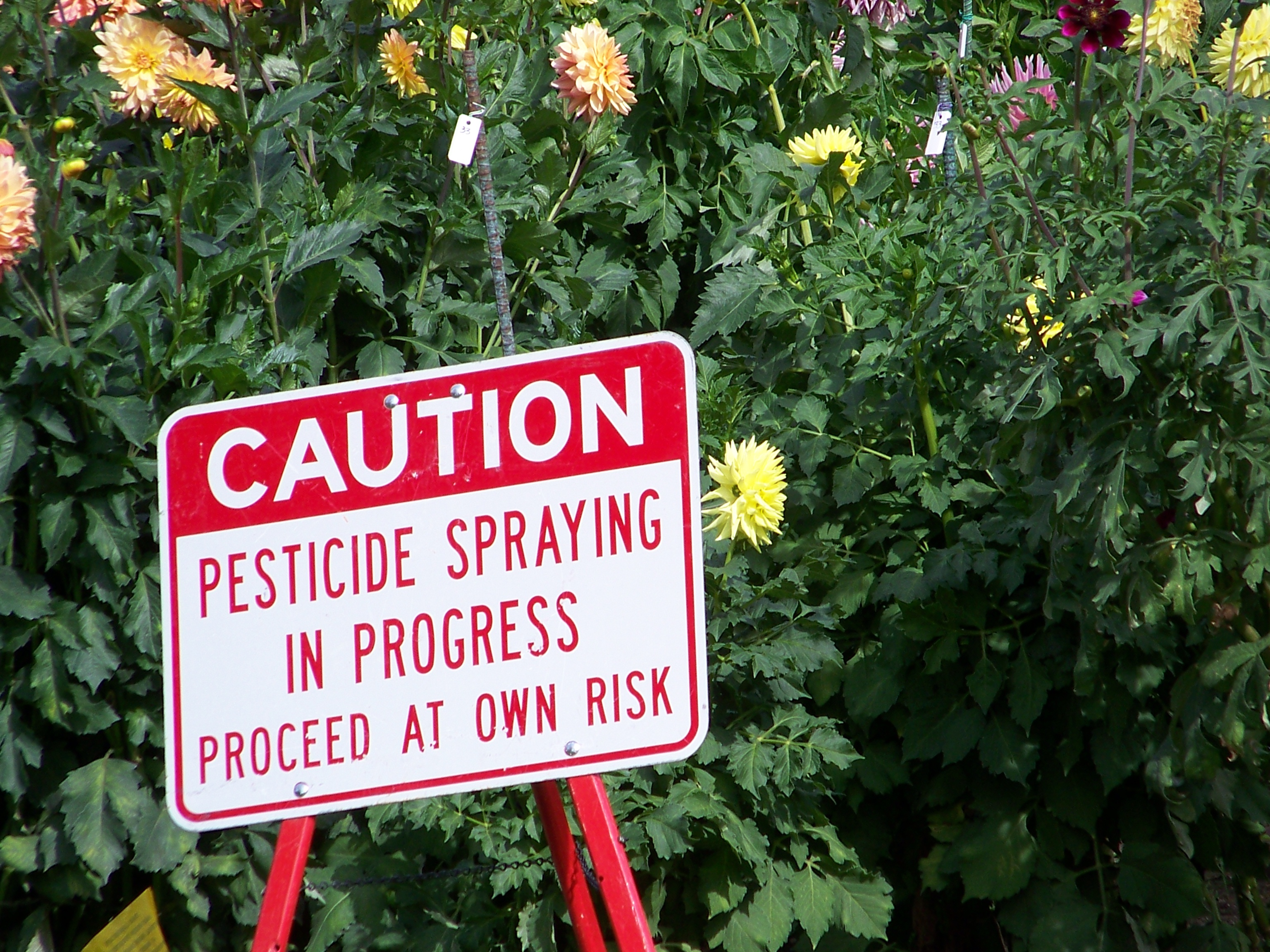
The use of pesticides is a regulated yet everyday farming practice. It can encroach a public nuisance threat if it drifts to neighboring properties, regardless of the application's intention.

For a nuisance claim to be legally applicable, there must be a substantial and unreasonable interference with the affected property interest. This interference may arise from either negligent or intentional conduct. In the context of farm operations, a nuisance may be considered intentional if it is a foreseeable result of the farmer's otherwise protected agricultural activities—even if the specific outcome was unintended. For example, pesticide drift from routine spraying that lands on a neighboring property can be classified as an intentional nuisance, despite the lack of intent to cause any harm. The farmer knew drift was possible while conducting this practice.

== State to state ==
Right-to-farm policies differ across various levels of government, being specialized to geographical land use and local agricultural productions. Variation potentially raises inconsistent interpretations of what qualifies as an "agrarian district" or a "proper" agrarian practice. Government officials may intervene and enact these laws for resource preservation or municipal management, and states and localities often have significant discretion in how they implement and enforce them.

While all fifty U.S. states have enacted Right-to-farm laws to protect agricultural operations, these laws share a common written structure and goals, yet each state has notable differences. Some frequent similarities include:

- Nuisance Lawsuit Protection: Shielding farms from nuisance claims directed at typical agricultural activities like odors, noise, or dust, particularly when farm operations predate their neighboring developments.
- Grandfathering: Most states prioritize the protection of farms that have been in operation before surrounding land use changes occurred, specifically in the event of urban development.
- "Generally accepted agricultural practices": Require agriculturalists to adhere to generally accepted agricultural practices, best management practices, and normal farming to receive protection explained. This ensures that the farmer is not out of operation scope.
- Exemption Limitations: Right-to-farm protection does not extend to operations that cause environmental damage, violation of accepted practices, or significant change in operation or land use that would otherwise be directed to zoning committees.

Despite the core foundation similarities, many states differ in how they structure their laws, just as each state approaches the agricultural industry differently. These key areas include:

- Scope of Protection: Some states extend Right-to-farm protection beyond traditional farming to forestry operations, food processing, and pesticide usage. Larger mid-west states such as Iowa and Indiana have particularly strong protections as agriculture is such a large industry in those regions. In addition to North Carolina, notably has one of the strongest Right-to-farm laws including significant limitations on damages and attorney fees directed to the farmers. These states in particular have seen large nuisance suits due to swine production and have relied on Right-to-farm policies to mitigate.
- Beyond Nuisance Claims: In the idea of protecting the farmer, many states require plaintiffs to demonstrate that the farming practices pose a substantial threat to public health and safety to pursue a nuisance claim. Likewise, Maryland, Vermont, and Minnesota mandates mediation before nuisance lawsuits can proceed. Other states expand protection beyond nuisance claims Arkansas and Texas consider attorney fees for prevailing agricultural defendants. North Dakota and Missouri are the only two states in the nation to include constitutional amendments so that modern farming shall forever be guaranteed in the state.

The North Dakota Initiated Constitutional Measure No. 3 ("Measure 3") expanded the state's protection beyond the general nuisance context. This amendment to the North Dakota Constitution introduced, "The right of farmers and ranchers to engage in modern farming and ranching practices shall be forever guaranteed in this state. No law shall be enacted which abridges the right of farmers and ranchers to employ agricultural technology, modern livestock production and ranching practices." As read, their Right-to-farm law expands to prevent any future state law from interfering with any aspect of an agricultural operation.

In New York, the Department of Agriculture and Markets (NYSDAM) reviews nuisance lawsuits on a case-by-case basis. As per§308 of New York's Right-to-farm statute, farm owners and operators are protected from private nuisance lawsuits, "provided such agricultural practice constitutes a sound agricultural practice pursuant to an opinion issued upon request by the commissioner". However, New York's policy does not extend protection to claims involving personal injury or wrongful death, nor does it apply to public nuisances. This definition can influence stakeholders' decisions to acquire farmland in states where their agricultural interests are more robustly safeguarded by state-specific Right-to-farm laws.

In 2025, Vermont significantly revised its Right-to-Farm law through Act 61 (S.45), expanding legal protections for agricultural operations. The new law eliminates the requirement that a farm must exist before nearby non-agricultural uses to qualify for nuisance protection. Farms are now protected from nuisance lawsuits so long as they follow generally accepted agricultural practices, regardless of when neighboring properties were developed. This change effectively removes the “coming to the nuisance” doctrine from Vermont farm-related nuisance disputes.

== Debate ==
The use of Right-to-farm policies to benefit corporate agriculture represents a classic 'wicked problem'--an issue characterized by complex interactions between "dynamic social and political, factors as well as biophysical complexities", and influenced by a wide range of stakeholders at the local, state, and federal levels. This diversity of actors contributes to significant variability in how these laws are interpreted and enforced, particularly in terms of what agricultural practices are protected. Although the original intent of Right-to-farm legislation was to uphold the nation's agrarian heritage and protect small-scale farmers, these policies are increasingly susceptible to misappropriation. A prominent example occurred in 2014, when the American Legislative Exchange Council (ALEC) financially supported Missouri's Right-to-farm amendment (Amendment 1), sparking controversy over whether such laws are being co-opted to favor large-scale, industrial agriculture over traditional family farms. Similarly, in 2016, Oklahoma voters rejected a proposed Right-to-farm amendment (State Question 777), with only 39.7% voting in favor. The bill had been strongly endorsed by the Oklahoma Farm Bureau and received notable support from voters in the panhandle region, home to a major pork production facility operated by the multinational agribusiness Seaboard Corporation.

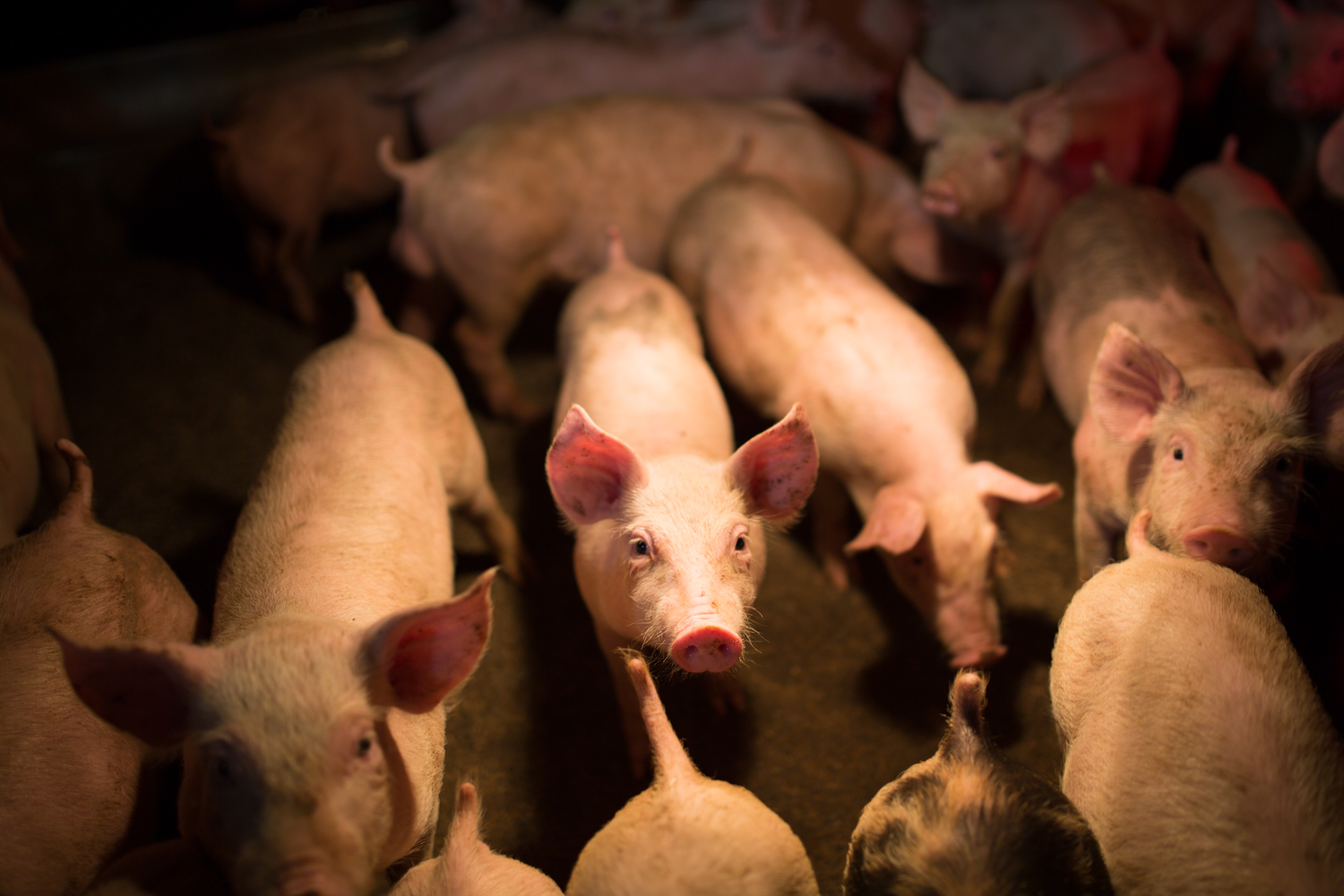
A common theme in nuisance claims involves swine production operations due to large numbers of hogs emitting odors and noise.

One of the most notable cases referring to nuisance complaints and testing the strength of North Carolina's code was McKiver V. Murphy-Brown 2020. Murphy-Brown, LLC raised hogs for Smithfield Foods—the largest pork producer in the world—in Confined Animal Feeding Operations (CAFOs). Neighboring residents filed nuisance claims regarding odors, noise, flies, and manure waste, allegedly depleting the enjoyment of their property. Over 500 plaintiffs filed 20 lawsuits regarding these claims. The Murphy-Brown operation used large open-air lagoons for manure waste accounting for the lingering smell. Manure also served the purpose of fertilizer as liquified waste was sprayed on fields. Plaintiffs claimed that these actions were beyond normal farming practices and were not generally accepted regardless of the Right-to-farm laws.

The issue of this case concerned North Carolina's Right-to-farm act's scope of protection for large hog farms against nuisance lawsuits brought by neighboring property owners. The ruling included that North Carolina's law does protect agricultural operations if the farm has been in operation for more than one year and if the operation was not negligent or violating environmental law. The court held that Murphy-Brown was indeed not protected under North Carolina's Right-to-farm as the nuisance stemmed from corporate decisions and practices (Smithfield's influence) which exceed normal farming activities. The court found that these activities were excessively harmful and the company's (Murphy-Brown and Smithfield) economic benefits outweighed the consideration of the community's impact as the stated waste management practices aimed to maximize profit not mitigate harm. This holding rested on the findings of corporate disregard for neighbor's well-being. Concluding court action, Plaintiffs were awarded nearly $500 million, and verdicts were upheld on appeal. The result of this legislation initiated North Carolina to tighten their Right-to-farm act in the following years in hopes of avoiding this occurrence.

On the bright note of Right-to-farm success is the case of Himsel v. 4/9 Livestock, LLC 2019 of the Indiana Supreme Court. In years prior, Samuel Himsel and his family converted a family farm from crop production to a CAFO, housing nearly 8,000 hogs, known as 4/9 Livestock, LLC. This operation neighbored Martin Himsel and family who filed a nuisance, negligence, and trespass claim in regards to odors that diminished the neighboring property value and their quality of life.

The Indiana trial court granted summary judgment in favor of defendants 4/9 Livestock, LLC, stating that the Right-to-farm act protected against the plaintiff's claims. The Indiana Court of Appeals then affirmed the trial court's decision. The issue of this case was to determine if nuisance, negligence, and trespass claims pertained to converted agricultural operations under Indiana's Right to Farm Act and if the act is constitutional under the Open Courts Clause, Takings Clause, and Equal Privileges and Immunities Clause.

The ruling found that Indiana's Right-to-farm claims that agricultural operations are not nuisances if the operation has been in continuous operation for more than one year, if there is no significant change in the type of operation, or if the operation would not have been a nuisance at the time it began. Within the fine print, Indiana's Right-to-farm states that a change from one type of agricultural operation to another does not constitute a significant change in the type of operation. This note leads to the holding that the Right-to-farm barred plaintiff's claims as the land has been used for agricultural purposes since the early 1940s and the conversion from crop to CAFO does not constitute a significant change. Regarding the constitutional challenges, the court held that legislation has the authority to modify common law causes of action regarding Open Courts Clause, meaning that the Right-to-farm law does not arbitrarily deny access to the courts. The court found no takings clause as the plaintiffs had not been deprived of all economic value. Finally, the court held that the Right-to-farm act preferential treatment of agriculture is reasonable with respect to Equal Privileges and Immunities Clause. Taking all into consideration, the Indiana Court of Appeals affirmed trial court's summary judgement in favor of 4/9 Livestock, LLC.

Himsel v. 4/9 Livestock, LLC reinforces the protection from Indiana's Right-to-farm act for agricultural operations in good standing as well as upholding the act's constitutionality.

== Learn more ==
Each state's Right-to-farm law is available at the National Agricultural Law Center's completed map as well as each county's comprehensive plan and town's code via eCode360. Property Observer covers the Right to farm law legislated by the NSW government.

== See also ==
- Agricultural zoning
- NIMBY
