= Luohe =

Luohe 漯河市 Loho
- Prefecture-level city
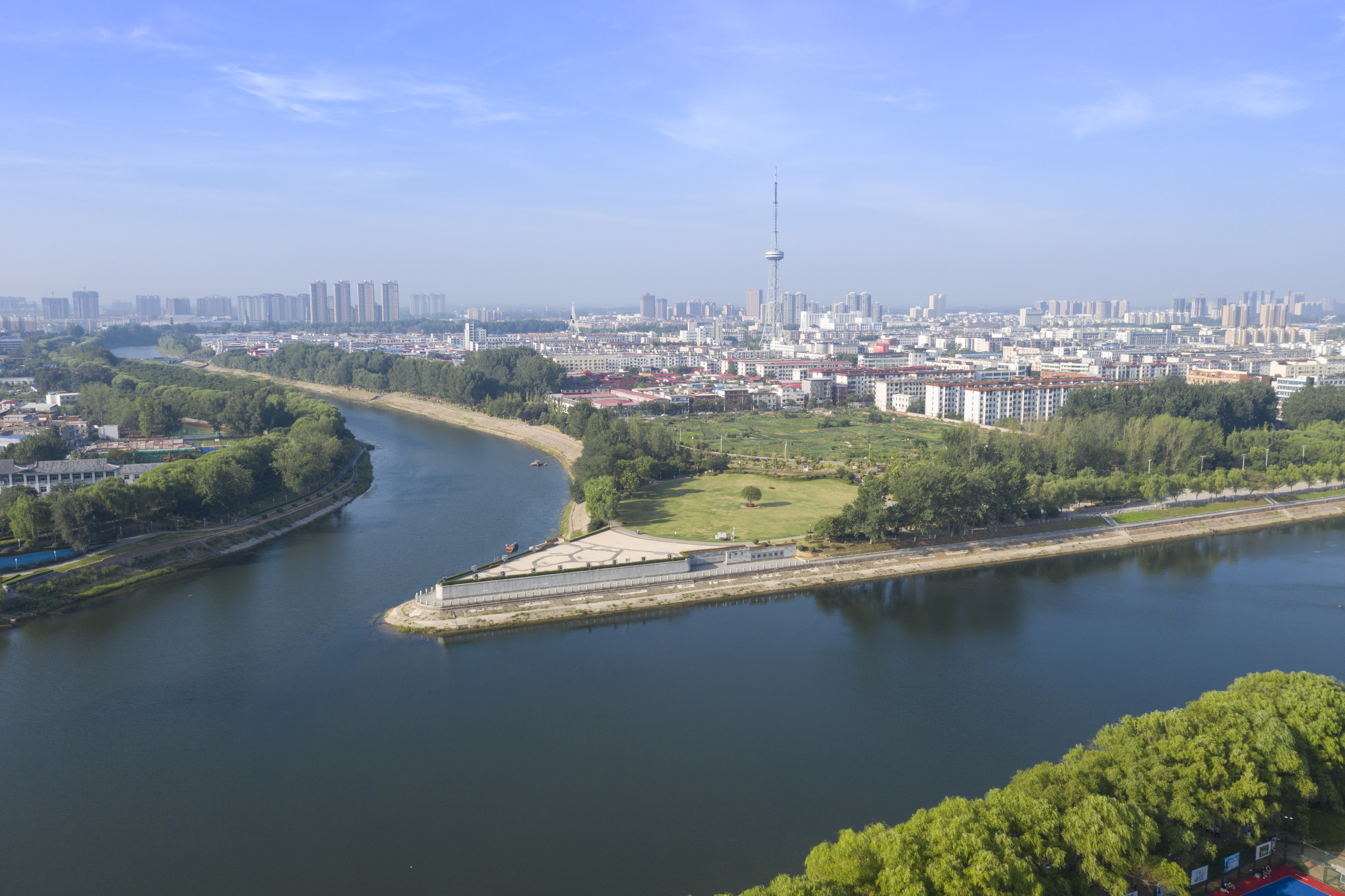
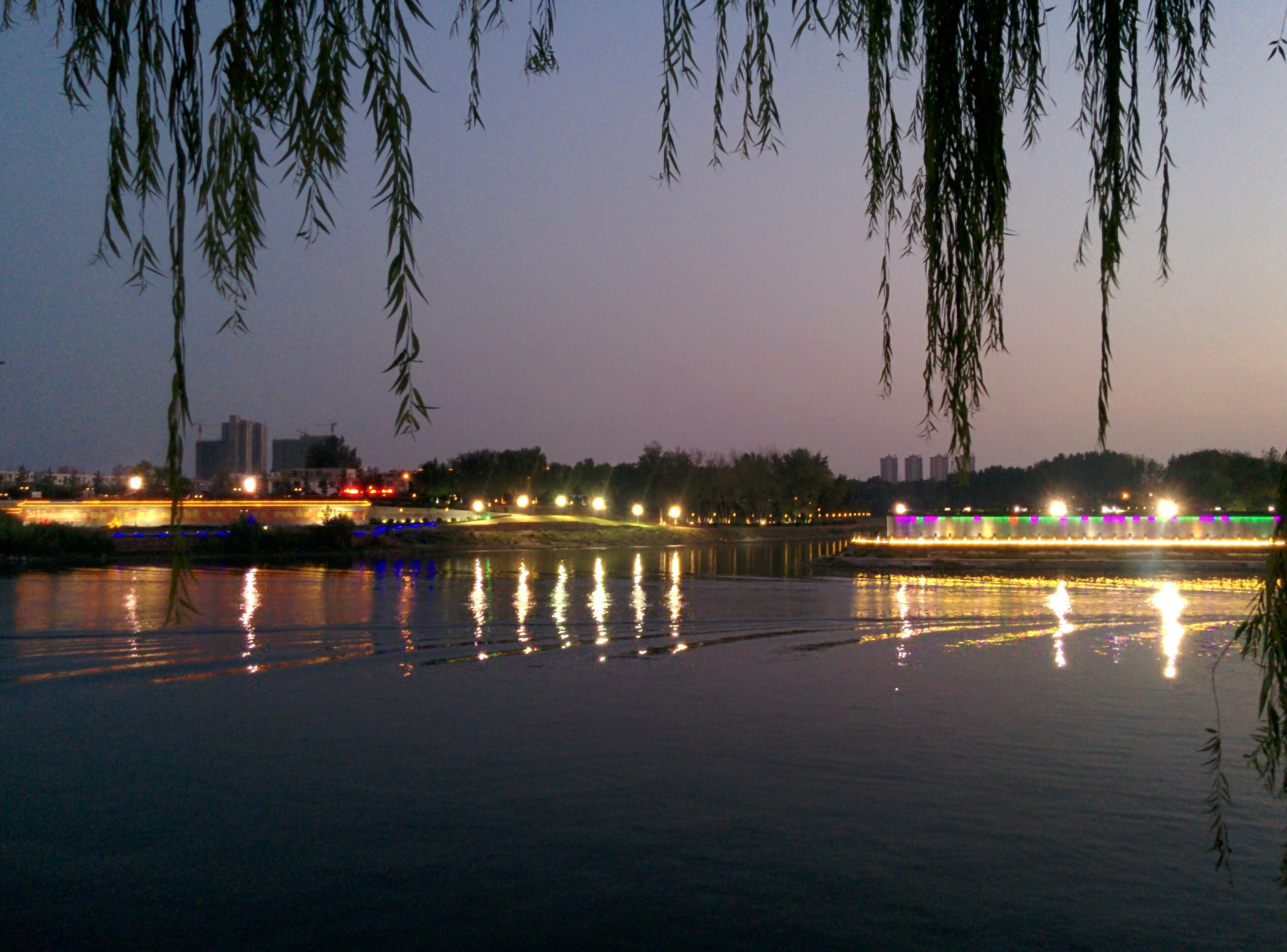
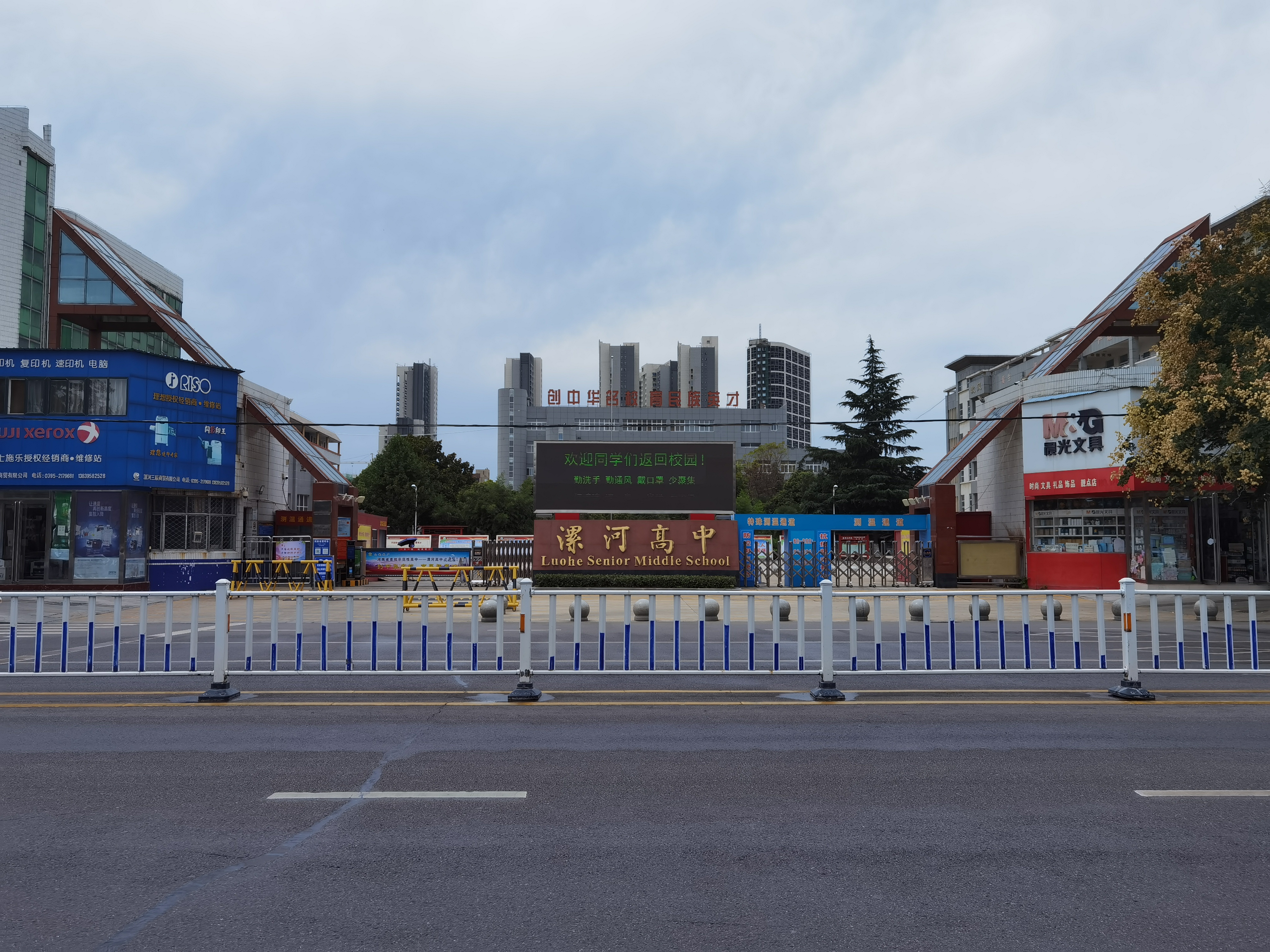
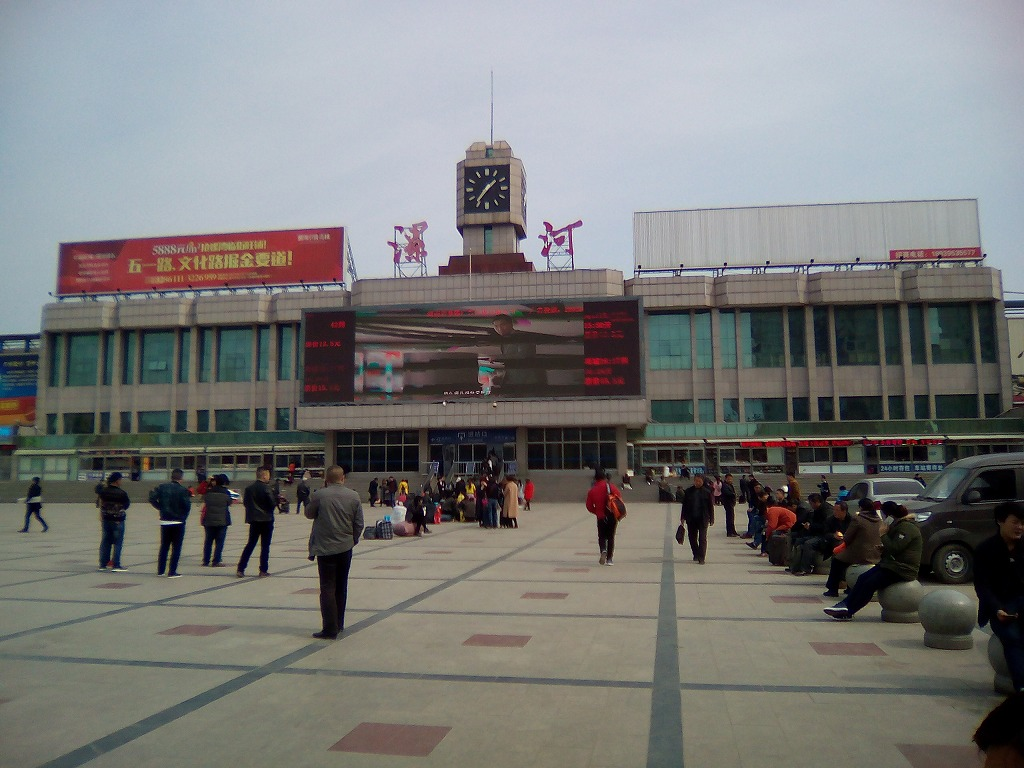
- From top, left to right: Aerial view of Luohe; Shali river at night; South gate of Luohe Senior Middle School; Luohe railway station

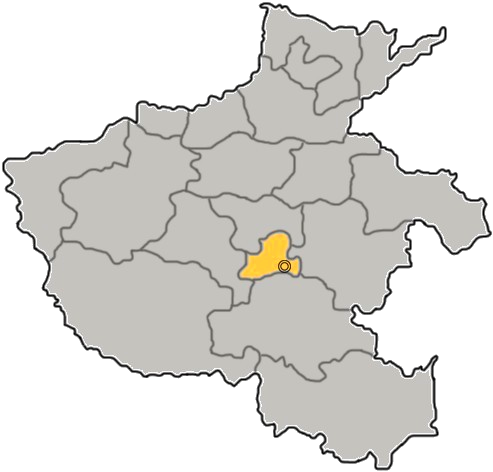
- Location of Luohe City jurisdiction in Henan

- Location on the North China Plain Luohe (China)
- Coordinates (Luohe municipal government): 33°34′49″N 114°01′00″E
- Country: People's Republic of China
- Province: Henan
- Municipal seat: Yancheng District

Area
  - Prefecture-level city: 2,617 km^{2} (1,010 sq mi)
  - Urban: 1,020 km^{2} (390 sq mi)
  - Metro: 1,020 km^{2} (390 sq mi)

Population (2020 census)
  - Prefecture-level city: 2,367,490
  - Density: 904.7/km^{2} (2,343/sq mi)
  - Urban: 1,326,687
  - Urban density: 1,300/km^{2} (3,370/sq mi)
  - Metro: 1,326,687
  - Metro density: 1,300/km^{2} (3,370/sq mi)

GDP
  - Prefecture-level city: CN¥ 108.2 billion US$ 16.3 billion
  - Per capita: CN¥ 41,138; US$ 6,193
- Time zone: UTC+8 (China Standard)
- Postal code: 462000
- Area code: 0395
- ISO 3166 code: CN-HA-11
- Major Nationalities: Han
- County-level divisions: 5
- Township-level divisions: 55
- License plate prefixes: 豫L
- Website: www.luohe.gov.cn

Luohe (Chinese: 漯河; pinyin: Luòhé; postal: Loho) is a prefecture-level city in central Henan province, China. It is surrounded by the cities of Xuchang, Zhoukou, Zhumadian and Pingdingshan on its north, east, south and west respectively. Its population was 2,367,490 inhabitants at the 2020 Chinese census whom 1,326,687 lived in the built-up (or metro) area made up of Yancheng, Shaoling and Yuanhui districts.

== Administration ==
The prefecture level city of Luohe directly administers 3 districts and 2 counties, which themselves administer 7 subdistricts, 49 towns and townships, 1,262 villages, and 78 residential communities.

Map
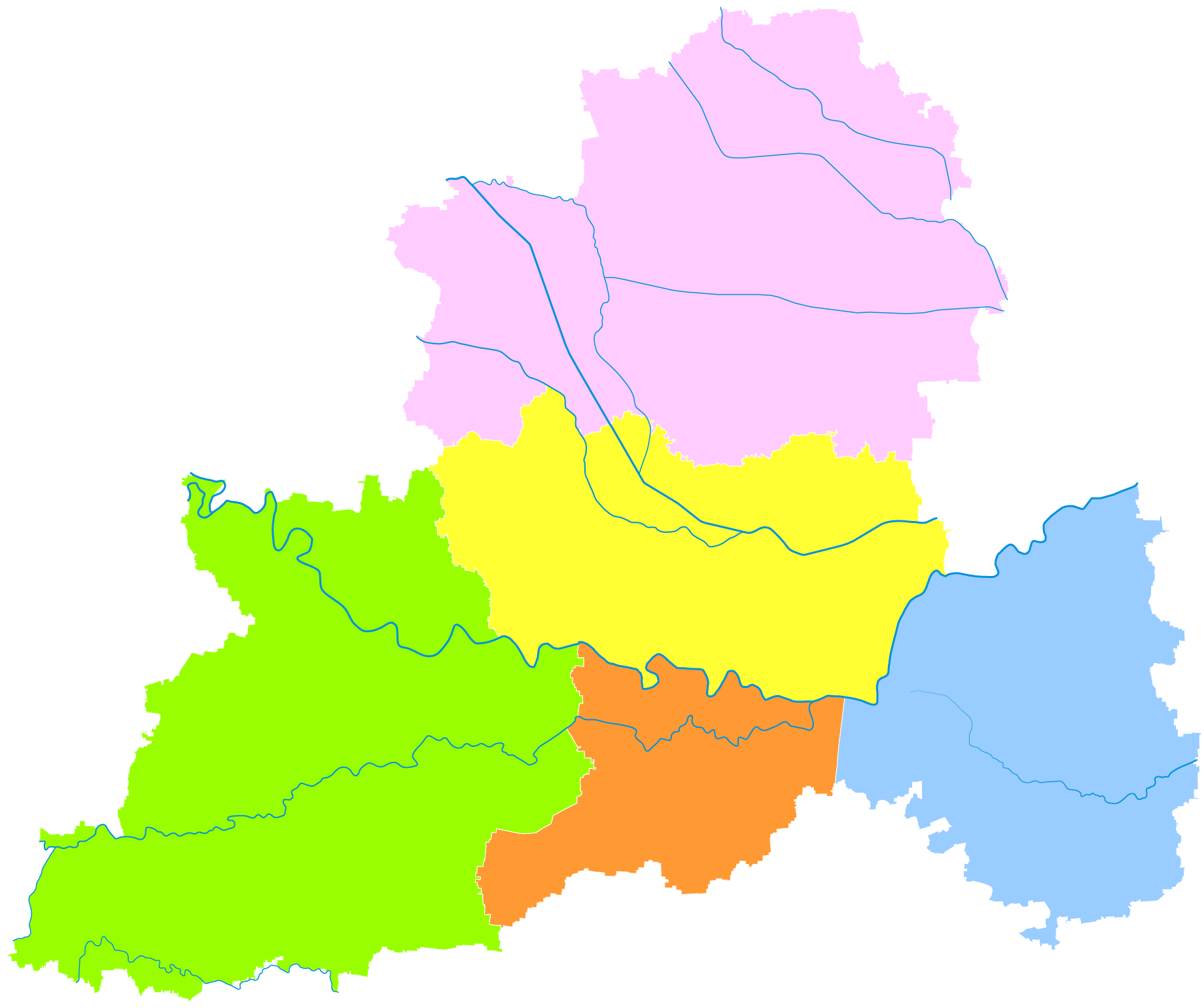

Administrative Divisions of Luohe
Postal Code	Name	Division Type	Area (sq. km)	Population (2017)	Population Density (per sq. km, 2017)
462000	Yuanhui District (源汇区)	District	202	342,300	1,694.55
462300	Yancheng District (郾城区)	District	413	513,800	1,244.07
462003	Shaoling District (召陵区)	District	405	427,600	1,055.80
462400	Wuyang County (舞阳县)	County	776	560,600	722.42
462600	Linying County (临颍县)	County	821	732,600	892.33

== Geography ==
Luohe spans parts of central and southern Henan Province, spanning from 113°27′E to 114°16′E in terms of longitude, and from 33°24′N to 33°59′N in terms of latitude. The city is located near the Funiu Mountains and the Huaibei Plains, and the city's 81 different rivers are all a part of the Huai River system.

=== Climate ===
Climate data for Luohe, elevation 59 m (194 ft), (1991–2020 normals, extremes 1981–present)
Month	Jan	Feb	Mar	Apr	May	Jun	Jul	Aug	Sep	Oct	Nov	Dec	Year
Record high °C (°F)	21.4 (70.5)	24.9 (76.8)	34.0 (93.2)	33.1 (91.6)	39.9 (103.8)	41.0 (105.8)	40.7 (105.3)	39.8 (103.6)	38.1 (100.6)	35.0 (95.0)	29.3 (84.7)	20.9 (69.6)	41.0 (105.8)
Mean daily maximum °C (°F)	6.4 (43.5)	10.1 (50.2)	15.4 (59.7)	21.8 (71.2)	27.4 (81.3)	32.3 (90.1)	32.5 (90.5)	30.9 (87.6)	27.4 (81.3)	22.3 (72.1)	14.9 (58.8)	8.5 (47.3)	20.8 (69.5)
Daily mean °C (°F)	1.3 (34.3)	4.6 (40.3)	9.8 (49.6)	15.9 (60.6)	21.6 (70.9)	26.4 (79.5)	27.8 (82.0)	26.2 (79.2)	21.9 (71.4)	16.5 (61.7)	9.4 (48.9)	3.3 (37.9)	15.4 (59.7)
Mean daily minimum °C (°F)	−2.6 (27.3)	0.3 (32.5)	5.0 (41.0)	10.6 (51.1)	16.2 (61.2)	21.3 (70.3)	24.0 (75.2)	22.7 (72.9)	17.7 (63.9)	11.9 (53.4)	5.1 (41.2)	−0.6 (30.9)	11.0 (51.7)
Record low °C (°F)	−14.2 (6.4)	−15.0 (5.0)	−7.8 (18.0)	−0.2 (31.6)	4.7 (40.5)	12.5 (54.5)	17.0 (62.6)	13.3 (55.9)	8.1 (46.6)	0.4 (32.7)	−9.0 (15.8)	−11.0 (12.2)	−15.0 (5.0)
Average precipitation mm (inches)	16.5 (0.65)	18.1 (0.71)	34.8 (1.37)	45.2 (1.78)	73.0 (2.87)	90.2 (3.55)	181.0 (7.13)	150.3 (5.92)	73.3 (2.89)	46.7 (1.84)	36.1 (1.42)	15.5 (0.61)	780.7 (30.74)
Average precipitation days (≥ 0.1 mm)	4.8	5.2	6.6	6.3	8.4	8.0	11.1	10.8	9.1	6.8	6.0	4.6	87.7
Average snowy days	4.4	2.8	1.1	0.1	0	0	0	0	0	0	0.9	2.3	11.6
Average relative humidity (%)	66	65	66	68	67	65	78	81	76	69	70	67	70
Mean monthly sunshine hours	127.0	133.4	172.4	201.6	210.9	194.7	194.7	179.8	161.4	154.6	140.6	131.7	2,002.8
Percentage possible sunshine	40	43	46	51	49	45	45	44	44	44	45	43	45
Source: China Meteorological Administration all-time January high

== Economy ==
Consistent with the broader trends of China's economic expansion, Luohe city has reported consistent GDP growth throughout the 2010s. Luohe is also famous for being home to Nanjie Village, which has gained fame due to its Maoist-styled collective-ownership.

Gross Domestic Product of Luohe
Year	GDP (billion Yuan)	Annual Growth (%)
2010	68.049	+15.01%
2011	75.170	+10.46%
2012	79.712	+5.70%
2013	86.154	+8.08%
2014	94.116	+9.24%
2015	99.285	+5.49%
2016	108.193	+8.97%
2017	116.504	+7.68%
2018	123.666	+6.15%

=== Agriculture ===
The city's main agricultural products include wheat, corn, cotton, peanut oil, vegetables, mushrooms, melons, and fruit. The city is famous for its ham production industry. WH Group, the world's largest pork producer in the world, and owner of Smithfield Foods, has its Chinese headquarters in Luohe.

=== Natural resources ===
Much of Luohe's natural resources come from the rivers of the city. The city's rivers are bountiful with rock salt of a high enough grade to be used in food preparation. The rivers of the city also have a particular type of sand which is suitable for being used in building materials.

=== Industry ===
A commercial center since ancient times, Luohe presently is home to many light industries such as food preparation, textile production, plastic production, and shoe production. Heavy industries, such as cement production, are also present.

=== Services ===
The city's tertiary industry has grown in recent years faster than overall economy. As of 2018, the city's tertiary industry had an output of 38.44 billion Yuan, 31.1% of the city's total.

== Education ==
In 2018, Luohe City's secondary vocational education enrolled 9,200 students (excluding technical schools), with 27,800 students and 8,100 graduates. Regular high schools have 15,900 students, 47,400 students and 15,500 graduates. There are 35,100 students enrolled in junior high schools, 98,900 students and 30,500 graduates. Primary school enrollment was 35,500, with 205,700 students and 34,800 graduates. There are 98,100 children in kindergartens.

== Notable people ==
- Xu Shen (許慎): famous scholar during the Han dynasty. He compiled the first Chinese character dictionary Shuowen Jiezi.
