= WH Group =

Chinese multinational company

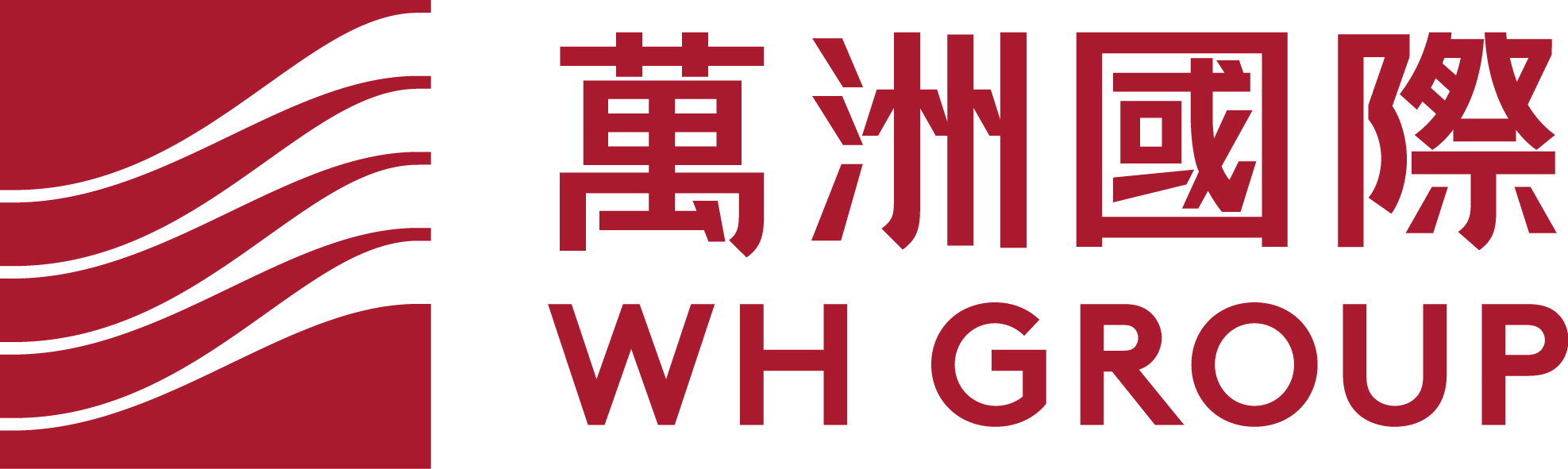
- Native name: 万洲国际
- Type: Public
- Traded as: SEHK: 288; HSI component
- Industry: Food
- Founded: 1958; 68 years ago
- Headquarters: Hong Kong
- Key people: Wan Long (chairman)
- Products: Meat
- Revenue: US$24.1 billion
- Number of employees: 101,000
- Subsidiaries: Henan Shuanghui Investment & Development; Smithfield Foods
- Website: WH Group; Shuanghui Development

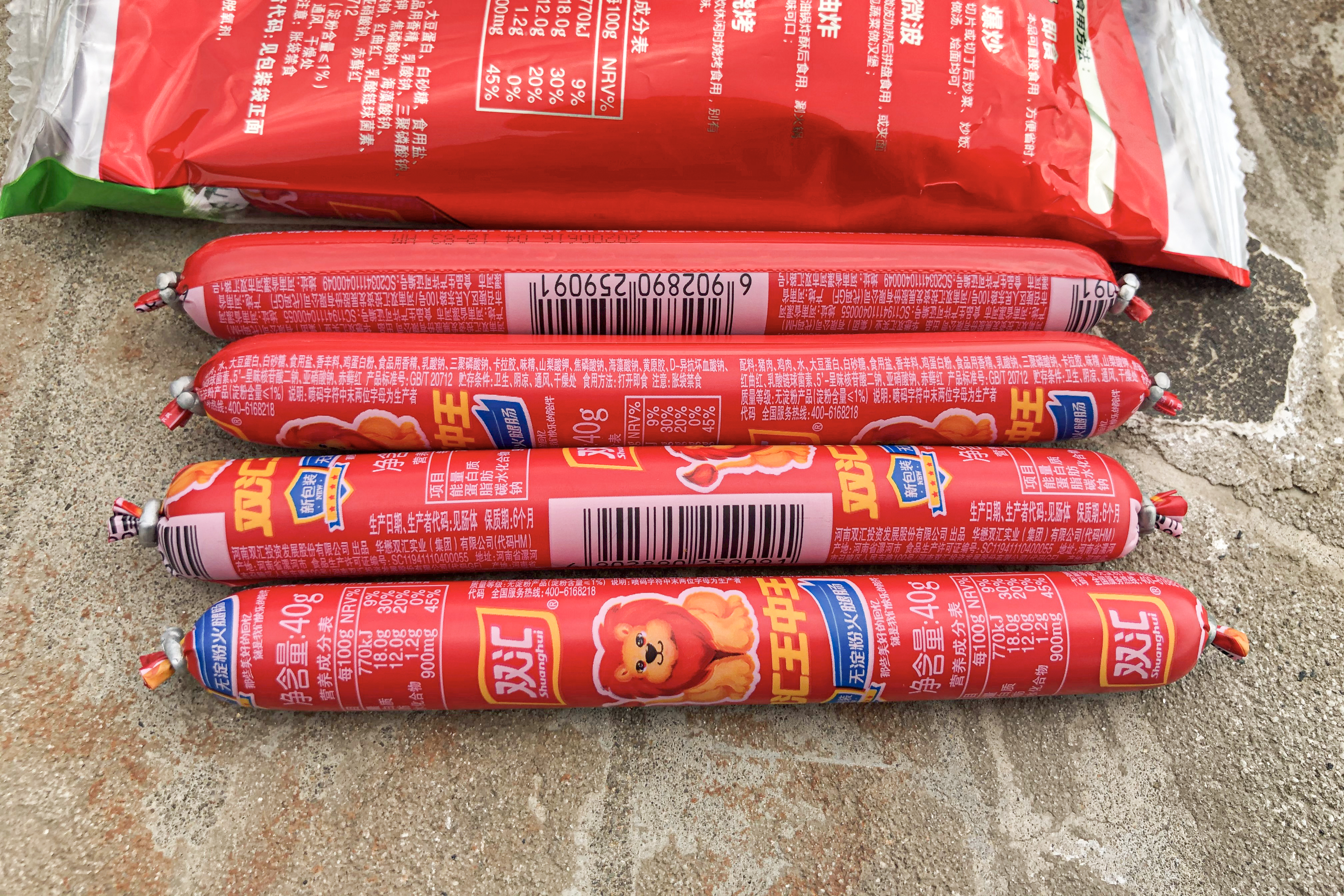
Shuanghui Huotuichang manufactured by Henan Shuanghui Investment & Development

WH Group (Chinese: 万洲国际; pinyin: Wànzhōu Guójì), formerly known as Shuanghui Group (Chinese: 双汇集团; pinyin: Shuānghuì Jítuán), is a publicly traded Hong Kong-based multinational meat and food processing company headquartered in Hong Kong. Sometimes also known as Shineway Group in English-speaking countries, the company's businesses include hog raising, consumer meat products, flavoring products, and logistics. It is the largest meat producer in China.

In 2021, WH Group ranked 3rd on FBIF's Top 100 Chinese Food & Beverage Companies list.

Wan Long is the chairman and chief executive officer of WH Group. Kenneth M. Sullivan, the president and chief executive officer of Smithfield Foods, became an executive director of WH Group in January 2016.

== Operations ==
Shuanghui has 13 facilities that produce more than 2.7 million tons of meat per year. It slaughters more than 15 million pigs a year, but only raises about 400,000; the rest are purchased from suppliers. The company holds more than 500 patents and produces 1,000 products. As of May 2013, Zhijun Yang is the managing director. The company employs approximately 101,000 employees as of 2019, and is 30% employee-owned.

== History ==
Shuanghui was founded by the Luohe municipal government in 1958 with a single processing plant. Wan Long joined the plant in 1968, and became the plant's general manager by 1984. Under Wan, the company has expanded aggressively. In his first year, he turned around a struggling company, bringing it from a net loss to a net profit of 5 million yuan ($1.7 million).

In 1992, sausage sales fueled the expansion of the company which in turn resulted in investors from six countries founding Shuanghui International.

The company introduced its first branded meat product to the market in February 1992. Later that year, Shuanghui formed a joint venture with 16 institutional investors from six countries. In 1994, the venture was consolidated as Shuanghui Group. Shuanghui subsidiary Henan Shuanghui Investment & Development Company Limited (SZSE: 000895) was established and listed on the Shenzhen Stock Exchange in 1998. In 2000, Shuanghui started a post-secondary educational-work research division.

By 2006, Shuanghui was the largest food processor in China by corporate valuation, and 131st largest company overall. The company was valued at $1.3 billion, and controlled more than 50% of China's high-temperature processed meat market at that time. That year, Luohe government sold its share of Shuanghui to a joint venture of Goldman Sachs and private equity firm CDH Investments. Goldman Sachs later sold most of its share, reportedly for a large profit, but owned 5.2% of the company as of May 2013. Wan Long was appointed chairman of the company on 16 October 2007.

In 2011, the firm set up a sales operation in Japan.

=== Acquisition of Smithfield Foods ===
In May 2013, Shuanghui announced its intention to buy Smithfield Foods for $34 per share, or about US$4.72 billion total. Including assumed debt, the total value of the deal was about $7.1 billion. The agreed purchase price represented a 31% premium over Smithfield's market price at the time when the deal was announced. The two sides negotiated for four years prior to their agreement.

Before it was finalized, the deal had to be approved by Smithfield shareholders and the Committee on Foreign Investment in the United States. It was ultimately approved by Smithfield shareholders on 24 September 2013, and the merger was to be completed two days later.

Smithfield CEO Larry Pope stated the deal would "[preserve] the same old Smithfield, only with more opportunities and new markets and new frontiers." No Chinese pork would be imported to the United States, he stated, but rather Shuanghui desired to export American pork. There is a growing demand for foreign food products in China due to recent food scandals. Smithfield's existing management team would remain intact and no major changes to its workforce would occur. Analyst Derek Scissors said companies such as Shuanghui are "not looking to cause any trouble in the American market ...They want to gain from what the U.S. is able to do." China has been a net importer of pork since 2008.

The deal was the largest ever takeover of a U.S. company by a Chinese company, roughly doubling the number of US jobs tied to direct investment by China. Smithfield ceased to be publicly traded at the deal's completion.

In July 2013, Shuanghui announced its plan to list Smithfield on the Hong Kong Stock Exchange after completing the takeover. The IPO was expected to see the firm valued at around $4 billion. However, the IPO plan was ultimately scrapped in 2014.

In January 2014, Shanghui International changed its name to WH Group, though one of its subsidiaries, Henan Shuanghui Investment & Development Company, retained the Shanghui brand. The new name is derived from the initials of "Wanzhou Holdings," where the Chinese characters "wan" and "zhou" connote eternity and continents, respectively.

In June 2015, Smithfield disposed of their 37% interest in Spanish meat processor Campofrío Food Group, to the Mexican Alfa Group for $354 million. The reason for the transaction given by CEO Larry Pope, was to improve Smithfield's balance sheet and allow cash reserves for strategic acquisitions aligning with long-term goals.

In 2016, WH Group's profits increased by more than 17 percent. This increase in profitability was primarily driven by the growth of Smithfield Foods.

In 2016, Smithfield Foods acquired California-based Clougherty Packing from Hormel Foods for $145 million. Numerous brands were included in the acquisition such as Farmer John and Saag's Specialty Meats. Clougherty had a large selection of pork products and a large sales network in the southwestern United States. Smithfield also acquired hog farms in Snowflake, Arizona with land tax $75,000 a year, California, and Wyoming as part of the deal.

In 2017, Smithfield Foods acquired the remaining 66.5% of the equity in Pini Polonia. After the acquisition, it became wholly owned by Smithfield Foods. Pini Polonia has a slaughterhouse in Poland. The firm also has facilities in Italy and Hungary. The deal included the acquisition of Pini Polska, Hamburger Pini, and Royal Chicken. The price paid was not disclosed.

In late March 2020, WH Group announced that the spread of COVID-19 had a very limited impact on its operations and sales in the US and China. The company said 95% of its operations were back to normal.

== See also ==
- Impact of the 2019–20 coronavirus pandemic on the meat industry in the United States
