= Freyberg =

Freyberg may refer to:

- Barbara Freyberg, Baroness Freyberg (died 1973), British peeress
- Bernard Freyberg, 1st Baron Freyberg (1889–1963), New Zealand's most famous soldier and military commander
- Paul Richard Freyberg, 2nd Baron Freyberg (1923–1993), British peer
- Valerian Freyberg, 3rd Baron Freyberg (born 1970), British peer

== See also ==
- Baron Freyberg
- Freiberg (disambiguation)
- Freiburg (disambiguation)
- Freyberg High School
- Freyburg (disambiguation)
- Friberg
- Fribourg (disambiguation)
