= List of governors-general of New Zealand =

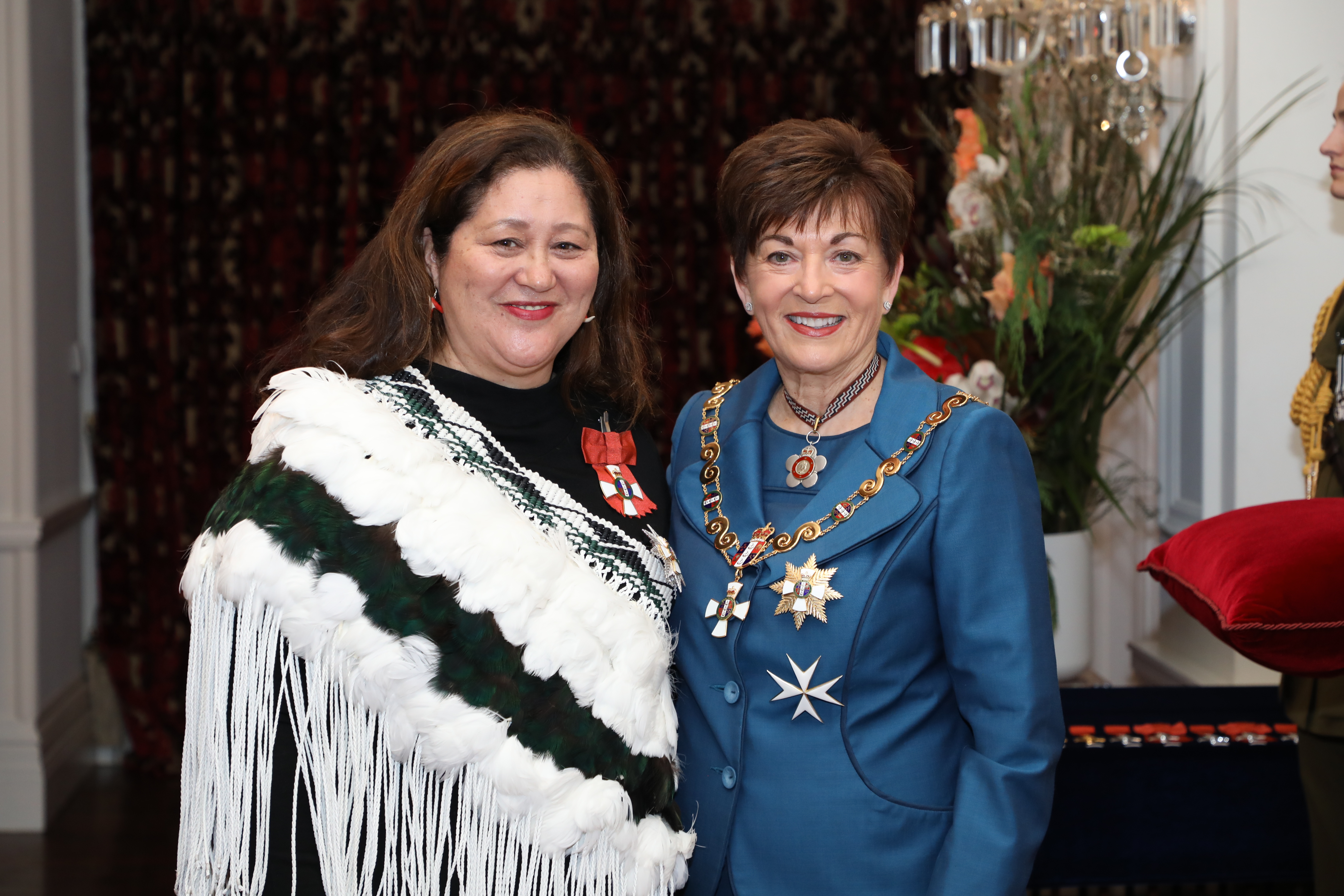
Cindy Kiro (left), the incumbent governor-general, with her immediate predecessor, Patsy Reddy, in May 2021

The following is a list of the governors and governors-general of New Zealand. As the personal representative of the New Zealand monarch, the governor-general performs many of the functions vested in the Crown, such as summoning and dissolving Parliament, granting or withholding the Royal Assent, making state visits, and receiving ambassadors. These functions are performed on the advice of the head of government, the prime minister.

From William Hobson's appointment in 1841, a total of 37 individuals have served as governor, governor-in-chief (1848–1853), or governor-general (since 1917). Sir Arthur Porritt was the first New Zealand-born governor-general, although he had been living in Britain for 31 years at the time of his appointment. All governors-general since Sir Denis Blundell in 1972 have been New Zealand residents and, with the exception of Sir David Beattie, New Zealand-born. The list does not include lieutenant-governors of the provinces of New Ulster and New Munster that existed between 1848 and 1853. (Note: For their respective lieutenant-governors, see New Ulster Province and New Munster Province.) The table also does not include administrators of the government, who fulfil viceregal duties between the terms of governors-general, or at other times when the governor-general is overseas or otherwise unable to carry out the role. The role of administrator is normally undertaken by the chief justice.

== Overview ==
Governors-general have been appointed under letters patent issued in 1917 and the current letters patent issued in 1983.

Historically, governors and governors-general were generally British aristocrats, a reflection of colonial-era affiliations. From the 1970s onward, however, a significant shift occurred, aligning with a more inclusive approach that mirrored New Zealand's diverse population. All governors-general since 1972 have been New Zealand residents. Sir Paul Reeves, in office from 1985 to 1990, was the first Māori governor-general. Dame Catherine Tizard, who served from 1990 to 1996, was the first female governor-general. Sir Anand Satyanand, who held the position from 2006 to 2011, was the first governor-general of Indian and of Pasifika ancestry. Governors-general have had a range of backgrounds, encompassing judges, a mayor, archbishop, surgeon, diplomat, general, farmer, and prime minister.

== List of officeholders ==
Governors and Governors-General of New Zealand
No.	Portrait	Name (Birth–Death)	Term of office		Length of term	Monarch	Premier/Prime Minister
As lieutenant-governor
1		William Hobson (1792–1842)	30 January 1840	3 May 1841	1 year, 93 days	Victoria	None (Note: New Zealand attained responsible government following the New Zealand Constitution Act 1852)
As governor
(1)		William Hobson (1792–1842)	3 May 1841	10 September 1842	1 year, 130 days	Victoria	None
2		Robert FitzRoy (1805–1865)	26 December 1843	17 November 1845	1 year, 326 days	Victoria	None
3		Sir George Grey (1812–1898)	18 November 1845	31 December 1853 (Note: Between 1 January 1848 and 7 March 1853, the viceregal representative held the office of governor-in-chief)	8 years, 43 days	Victoria	None
4		Thomas Gore Browne (1807–1887)	6 September 1855	2 October 1861	6 years, 26 days	Victoria	
4		Thomas Gore Browne (1807–1887)	6 September 1855	2 October 1861	6 years, 26 days	Victoria	Henry Sewell
4		Thomas Gore Browne (1807–1887)	6 September 1855	2 October 1861	6 years, 26 days	Victoria	William Fox
4		Thomas Gore Browne (1807–1887)	6 September 1855	2 October 1861	6 years, 26 days	Victoria	Edward Stafford
4		Thomas Gore Browne (1807–1887)	6 September 1855	2 October 1861	6 years, 26 days	Victoria	William Fox
(3)		Sir George Grey (1812–1898)	4 December 1861	5 February 1868	6 years, 63 days	Victoria	
(3)		Sir George Grey (1812–1898)	4 December 1861	5 February 1868	6 years, 63 days	Victoria	Alfred Domett
(3)		Sir George Grey (1812–1898)	4 December 1861	5 February 1868	6 years, 63 days	Victoria	Frederick Whitaker
(3)		Sir George Grey (1812–1898)	4 December 1861	5 February 1868	6 years, 63 days	Victoria	Frederick Weld
(3)		Sir George Grey (1812–1898)	4 December 1861	5 February 1868	6 years, 63 days	Victoria	Edward Stafford
5		Sir George Bowen (1821–1899)	5 February 1868	19 March 1873	5 years, 42 days	Victoria	
5		Sir George Bowen (1821–1899)	5 February 1868	19 March 1873	5 years, 42 days	Victoria	William Fox
5		Sir George Bowen (1821–1899)	5 February 1868	19 March 1873	5 years, 42 days	Victoria	Edward Stafford
5		Sir George Bowen (1821–1899)	5 February 1868	19 March 1873	5 years, 42 days	Victoria	George Waterhouse
5		Sir George Bowen (1821–1899)	5 February 1868	19 March 1873	5 years, 42 days	Victoria	William Fox
6		Sir James Fergusson, 6th Baronet (1832–1907)	14 June 1873	3 December 1874	1 year, 172 days	Victoria	Julius Vogel
7		George Phipps, 2nd Marquess of Normanby (1819–1890)	9 January 1875	21 February 1879	4 years, 43 days	Victoria	
7		George Phipps, 2nd Marquess of Normanby (1819–1890)	9 January 1875	21 February 1879	4 years, 43 days	Victoria	Daniel Pollen
7		George Phipps, 2nd Marquess of Normanby (1819–1890)	9 January 1875	21 February 1879	4 years, 43 days	Victoria	Julius Vogel
7		George Phipps, 2nd Marquess of Normanby (1819–1890)	9 January 1875	21 February 1879	4 years, 43 days	Victoria	Harry Atkinson
7		George Phipps, 2nd Marquess of Normanby (1819–1890)	9 January 1875	21 February 1879	4 years, 43 days	Victoria	George Grey
8		Sir Hercules Robinson (1824–1897)	17 April 1879	8 September 1880	1 year, 144 days	Victoria	
8		Sir Hercules Robinson (1824–1897)	17 April 1879	8 September 1880	1 year, 144 days	Victoria	John Hall
9		Sir Arthur Hamilton-Gordon (1829–1912)	29 November 1880	23 June 1882	1 year, 206 days	Victoria	
9		Sir Arthur Hamilton-Gordon (1829–1912)	29 November 1880	23 June 1882	1 year, 206 days	Victoria	Frederick Whitaker
10		Sir William Jervois (1821–1897)	20 January 1883	22 March 1889	6 years, 61 days	Victoria	
10		Sir William Jervois (1821–1897)	20 January 1883	22 March 1889	6 years, 61 days	Victoria	Harry Atkinson
10		Sir William Jervois (1821–1897)	20 January 1883	22 March 1889	6 years, 61 days	Victoria	Robert Stout
10		Sir William Jervois (1821–1897)	20 January 1883	22 March 1889	6 years, 61 days	Victoria	Harry Atkinson
10		Sir William Jervois (1821–1897)	20 January 1883	22 March 1889	6 years, 61 days	Victoria	Robert Stout
10		Sir William Jervois (1821–1897)	20 January 1883	22 March 1889	6 years, 61 days	Victoria	Harry Atkinson
11		William Onslow, 4th Earl of Onslow (1853–1911)	2 May 1889	24 February 1892	2 years, 298 days	Victoria	
11		William Onslow, 4th Earl of Onslow (1853–1911)	2 May 1889	24 February 1892	2 years, 298 days	Victoria	John Ballance
12		David Boyle, 7th Earl of Glasgow (1833–1915)	7 June 1892	6 February 1897	4 years, 244 days	Victoria	
13		Uchter Knox, 5th Earl of Ranfurly (1856–1933)	10 August 1897	19 June 1904	6 years, 314 days		Richard Seddon
13		Uchter Knox, 5th Earl of Ranfurly (1856–1933)	10 August 1897	19 June 1904	6 years, 314 days	Edward VII	Richard Seddon
14		William Plunket, 5th Baron Plunket (1864–1920)	20 June 1904	8 June 1910	5 years, 353 days		
14		William Plunket, 5th Baron Plunket (1864–1920)	20 June 1904	8 June 1910	5 years, 353 days		William Hall-Jones
14		William Plunket, 5th Baron Plunket (1864–1920)	20 June 1904	8 June 1910	5 years, 353 days		Joseph Ward
15		John Dickson-Poynder, 1st Baron Islington (1866–1936)	22 June 1910	2 December 1912	2 years, 163 days	George V	
15		John Dickson-Poynder, 1st Baron Islington (1866–1936)	22 June 1910	2 December 1912	2 years, 163 days	George V	Thomas Mackenzie
16		Arthur Foljambe, 2nd Earl of Liverpool (1870–1941)	19 December 1912	27 June 1917	4 years, 190 days		William Massey
As governor-general
1		Arthur Foljambe, 2nd Earl of Liverpool (1870–1941)	28 June 1917	7 July 1920	3 years, 9 days	George V	William Massey
2		John Jellicoe, 1st Viscount Jellicoe (1859–1935)	27 September 1920	26 November 1924	4 years, 60 days	George V	William Massey
3		Sir Charles Fergusson, 7th Baronet (1865–1951)	13 December 1924	8 February 1930	5 years, 57 days	George V	
3		Sir Charles Fergusson, 7th Baronet (1865–1951)	13 December 1924	8 February 1930	5 years, 57 days	George V	Francis Bell
3		Sir Charles Fergusson, 7th Baronet (1865–1951)	13 December 1924	8 February 1930	5 years, 57 days	George V	Gordon Coates
3		Sir Charles Fergusson, 7th Baronet (1865–1951)	13 December 1924	8 February 1930	5 years, 57 days	George V	Joseph Ward
4		Charles Bathurst, 1st Baron Bledisloe (1867–1958)	19 March 1930	15 March 1935	4 years, 361 days	George V	
4		Charles Bathurst, 1st Baron Bledisloe (1867–1958)	19 March 1930	15 March 1935	4 years, 361 days	George V	George Forbes
5		George Monckton-Arundell, 8th Viscount Galway (1882–1943)	12 April 1935	3 February 1941	5 years, 297 days		
5		George Monckton-Arundell, 8th Viscount Galway (1882–1943)	12 April 1935	3 February 1941	5 years, 297 days		Michael Joseph Savage
5		George Monckton-Arundell, 8th Viscount Galway (1882–1943)	12 April 1935	3 February 1941	5 years, 297 days	Edward VIII	Michael Joseph Savage
6		Sir Cyril Newall (1886–1963)	22 February 1941	19 April 1946	5 years, 56 days	George VI	Peter Fraser
7		Sir Bernard Freyberg (Note: Raised to the peerage as 1st Baron Freyberg during his term in office, in 1951.) (1889–1963)	17 June 1946	15 August 1952	6 years, 59 days		
8		Sir Willoughby Norrie (1893–1977)	2 December 1952	25 July 1957	4 years, 235 days	Elizabeth II	Sidney Holland
9		Charles Lyttelton, 10th Viscount Cobham (1909–1977)	5 September 1957	13 September 1962	5 years, 8 days	Elizabeth II	
9		Charles Lyttelton, 10th Viscount Cobham (1909–1977)	5 September 1957	13 September 1962	5 years, 8 days	Elizabeth II	Keith Holyoake
9		Charles Lyttelton, 10th Viscount Cobham (1909–1977)	5 September 1957	13 September 1962	5 years, 8 days	Elizabeth II	Walter Nash
10		Sir Bernard Fergusson (1911–1980)	9 November 1962	20 October 1967	4 years, 345 days	Elizabeth II	Keith Holyoake
11		Sir Arthur Porritt, 1st Baronet (1900–1994)	1 December 1967	6 September 1972	4 years, 280 days	Elizabeth II	
11		Sir Arthur Porritt, 1st Baronet (1900–1994)	1 December 1967	6 September 1972	4 years, 280 days	Elizabeth II	Jack Marshall
12		Sir Denis Blundell (1907–1984)	27 September 1972	5 October 1977	5 years, 8 days	Elizabeth II	
12		Sir Denis Blundell (1907–1984)	27 September 1972	5 October 1977	5 years, 8 days	Elizabeth II	Norman Kirk
12		Sir Denis Blundell (1907–1984)	27 September 1972	5 October 1977	5 years, 8 days	Elizabeth II	Bill Rowling
13		Sir Keith Holyoake (1904–1983)	26 October 1977	23 October 1980	2 years, 363 days	Elizabeth II	Robert Muldoon
14		Sir David Beattie (1924–2001)	6 November 1980	10 November 1985	5 years, 4 days	Elizabeth II	
14		Sir David Beattie (1924–2001)	6 November 1980	10 November 1985	5 years, 4 days	Elizabeth II	David Lange
15		Sir Paul Reeves (1932–2011)	20 November 1985	29 November 1990	5 years, 9 days	Elizabeth II	
15		Sir Paul Reeves (1932–2011)	20 November 1985	29 November 1990	5 years, 9 days	Elizabeth II	Geoffrey Palmer
15		Sir Paul Reeves (1932–2011)	20 November 1985	29 November 1990	5 years, 9 days	Elizabeth II	Mike Moore
16		Dame Catherine Tizard (1931–2021)	12 December 1990	3 March 1996	5 years, 104 days	Elizabeth II	Jim Bolger
17		Sir Michael Hardie Boys (1931–2023)	21 March 1996	21 March 2001	5 years	Elizabeth II	
17		Sir Michael Hardie Boys (1931–2023)	21 March 1996	21 March 2001	5 years	Elizabeth II	Jenny Shipley
18		Dame Silvia Cartwright (born 1943)	4 April 2001	4 August 2006	5 years, 122 days	Elizabeth II	Helen Clark
19		Sir Anand Satyanand (born 1944)	23 August 2006	23 August 2011	5 years	Elizabeth II	
20		Sir Jerry Mateparae (born 1954)	31 August 2011	31 August 2016	5 years	Elizabeth II	John Key
21		Dame Patsy Reddy (born 1954)	28 September 2016	28 September 2021	5 years	Elizabeth II	
21		Dame Patsy Reddy (born 1954)	28 September 2016	28 September 2021	5 years	Elizabeth II	Bill English
22		Dame Cindy Kiro (born 1958)	21 October 2021	Incumbent	4 years, 297 days	Elizabeth II	Jacinda Ardern
22		Dame Cindy Kiro (born 1958)	21 October 2021	Incumbent	4 years, 297 days	Charles III	
22		Dame Cindy Kiro (born 1958)	21 October 2021	Incumbent	4 years, 297 days	Charles III	Chris Hipkins
22		Dame Cindy Kiro (born 1958)	21 October 2021	Incumbent	4 years, 297 days	Charles III	Christopher Luxon

== Sources ==
- Beaglehole, Diana (30 October 2012). "Porritt, Arthur Espie". Dictionary of New Zealand Biography.
- "Governor-General of New Zealand: Former Governors-General". gov-gen.govt.nz. Archived from the original on 22 February 2013.
- James, Colin (22 August 2006). "The huge challenge ahead of the Maori Queen's successor". The New Zealand Herald. Archived from the original on 6 February 2012.
- McLean, Gavin (October 2006). The Governors, New Zealand Governors and Governors-General. Otago University Press. ISBN 978-1-877372-25-4.
- "Republic 'inevitable'–Clark". The Evening Post. 4 March 2002.
- "Patriated – the Governor-General". Ministry for Culture and Heritage. 20 December 2012.
