= Jean Barker, Baroness Trumpington =

British politician (1922–2018)

The Right Honourable The Baroness Trumpington DCVO PC
- Trumpington in 2011

Baroness-in-waiting; Government Whip
- In office 22 April 1992 – 2 May 1997
- Prime Minister: John Major
- Preceded by: The Baroness Denton
- Succeeded by: The Baroness Farrington
- In office 11 June 1983 – 25 March 1985
- Prime Minister: Margaret Thatcher
- Preceded by: The Lord Glenarthur
- Succeeded by: The Baroness Cox

Minister of State (Parliamentary Under-Secretary of State, 1987–1989) for Agriculture, Fisheries and Food
- In office 13 June 1987 – 14 April 1992
- Prime Minister: Margaret Thatcher; John Major
- Preceded by: John Gummer
- Succeeded by: David Curry

Parliamentary Under-Secretary of State for Health and Social Security
- In office 30 March 1985 – 13 June 1987
- Prime Minister: Margaret Thatcher
- Preceded by: The Lord Glenarthur
- Succeeded by: The Lord Skelmersdale

Mayor of Cambridge
- In office 1970–1971
- Preceded by: Brian Cooper
- Succeeded by: Peter Wright

Member of the House of Lords
- Lord Temporal
- Life peerage 4 February 1980 – 24 October 2017

Personal details
- Born: Jean Alys Campbell-Harris; 23 October 1922 London, England
- Died: 26 November 2018 (aged 96) London, England
- Party: Conservative
- Spouse: William Alan Barker (m. 1954; died 1988)
- Children: 1
- Occupation: Politician; secretary

Jean Alys Barker, Baroness Trumpington, DCVO, PC (née Campbell-Harris; 23 October 1922 – 26 November 2018) was a British Conservative politician and life peer. In the 1960s and 1970s she served in local government in Cambridgeshire. In 1980 she was created a life peer after which she served in the House of Lords. From an upper-class background, she was a socialite and a secretary before entering politics, as well as serving in naval intelligence in World War II.

== Early life ==
She was born as Jean Campbell-Harris, a daughter of Major Arthur Campbell-Harris, an officer in the 7th Hariana Lancers (part of the Bengal Lancers), who served as ADC to the Viceroy of India and was an acquaintance of David Lloyd George. Her mother was Doris Robson, a wealthy American heiress of a Chicago paint manufacturer.

Trumpington took dancing lessons at Madame Vacani's school in Knightsbridge. After two years she moved to the Ballet Rambert to learn under Pearl Argyle. Her mother had lost most of her inheritance in the Wall Street crash of 1929 and sold their home at 55 Great Cumberland Place. On the family's return from India they rented Rowling House, Goodnestone, near Sandwich, Kent, where Doris specialised in interior decorating. When war broke out, the landlord (the Lunacy Commissioners) repossessed the house for Army billets. Spring Grove was a Queen Anne-style ten-bedroom mansion at Wye, near Ashford in south Kent.

Educated at Princess Helena College, Trumpington, aged 15, left school never having taken an exam, although she was fluent in French, German and Italian. She then went to a finishing school in Paris to study art and literature. Her father took her on holiday to Biarritz.

I was a very good, left-handed tennis player. I had coaching all year round and there was serious talk of junior Wimbledon.

— Trumpington

She spent a year at Montrichard receiving coaching from French tennis champion Jean Borotra. In Paris, she stayed with Madame de Benouville, whose husband Jean was a member of the royalist group Action Française. When war broke out, she returned to England.

She had two brothers educated at Eton; the elder, Alastair, was at Royal Naval College, Dartmouth.

== Bletchley Park, World War II and its aftermath ==
Initially during World War II, Lady Trumpington was attached to Lloyd George's Sussex arable farm, where she worked on the land with his daughter, lodging with his then secretary/mistress and later wife Frances Stevenson. She recalled that Lloyd George used to find reasons that were never explained to use a tape measure to take all her measurements. (Note: As a guide to the reader the BBC describes Lloyd George as "famously priapic" and Lady Trumpington describes him as an "old goat".) She then worked in naval intelligence at Bletchley Park from October 1940, making use of her knowledge of the German language to crack naval codes.

She was billeted at Great Brickhill with W. J. Locke's family, before moving to Passenham Manor, home of banker George Ansley. Her work was the centre of Z codes supervised by German-Jewish refugee, Walter Ettinghausen. Colleagues who became life-long friends included Sally, daughter of 6th Lord Grantley (later Sarah Baring); Jean, daughter of James Graham, 6th Duke of Montrose (later Lady Jean Fforde); and Osla Benning.

Life only really began when I went to Bletchley. That's when I made my real friends, and it was exciting being a part of something important. We used to meet up in Claridge's, and throw bread at each other and sing and behave so badly. Five shillings was the most you could spend during the war, so it was as affordable as anywhere.

— Trumpington

At war's end, she spent four years working for the European Central Inland Transport Organization, shipping and distributing supplies to the war-torn continent with the same job description, filing clerk. But she was soon working as the effective transport manager from a 5th floor office in the Champs Elysées above Mimi Pinson's nightclub. She went to parties at the Ritz and Crillon Club, frequented by politicians. Resident at 1 Place d'Alma, she worked briefly for the suave British ambassador Duff Cooper, whose wife, previously Lady Diana Manners, was a former actress she used to visit on Broadway. Lady Diana was courted by Ernest Bevin, the Labour cabinet minister. She maintained a passion for tennis and French fashion.

Moving in political circles, she returned to London to work for an imperial Conservative, Victor Montagu, Viscount Hinchingbroke.

== New York socialite ==
In 1952, Trumpington moved to America, travelling on board RMS Mauretania and arriving at New York on 28 January. She shared a flat above the Stork Club on East 52nd Street, off Park Avenue. She was able to secure a position with an advertising agency, Fletcher Richards at the Rockefeller Center, off 5th Avenue. Shopping on 6th Avenue, she made friends with Riv Winant, son of John Gilbert Winant, a former American ambassador to London; their friendship turned out to be long-term. They frequented haunts of wealthy high society New Yorkers such as the Round Hill Country Club, Greenwich, Connecticut, and the River Club of New York City, and the homes of East Hampton, Long Island, with membership of the exclusive Maidstone Club. Fascinated by wealth, she got on the guest list of billionaire philanthropist, Walter Annenberg. Ronnie Furse taught her to water-ski in the Chesapeake Bay. For her, the physical prowess was unnecessary, but part of the tour. Working as a secretary, she moved into a flat on 137 East 73rd Street next to Furse.

Whilst in America, she met an Englishman, (William) Alan Barker, a master at Eton College and formerly a captain in the Royal Artillery, wounded in the leg in Normandy on 16 June 1944. While working on the Harkness Commonwealth Fellowship in New York, he offered to bring her back to London. She returned to Britain during the London Season and Queen Elizabeth II's coronation, and they were engaged in October 1953. Lady Trumpington left New York for the last time by liner on 15 December. She was forced to apply for a licence to the Solicitor-General so that they could become the first couple in modern times to hold a wedding at the Chapel of the Royal Hospital Chelsea, which took place on 18 March 1954.

== Return to England ==
After working at Eton, her husband was headmaster of The Leys School in Cambridge between 1958 and 1975, before moving to University College School, London. She played host to the rich and famous, often travelling abroad to raise funds for The Leys from parents and old boys. They invited the local dignitaries Edward Heath MP and the Duchess of Kent with the Prime Minister of Singapore to an open day. In 1961, the Queen Mother came to tea, and then again to open an extension to buildings in 1973.

On the day that Harold Wilson resigned in 1970 she invited Heath to view the cricket pitches, which was reciprocated by a visit to No.10. Other royalty continued to attend from Bahrain and Tonga. She promoted the school with her own brand of conservatism, taking care of mental health and epilepsy in the school. With Eton's help they started a boat club, spent time at Cliveden and in 1962 included among their friends, the Astors. The Macmillan era was rounded off with a world tour to drum up school business.

The couple had one son, Adam Campbell Barker, born on 31 August 1955. Adam was educated at King's School, Canterbury and Queens' College, Cambridge. He qualified as a solicitor and, later, as a barrister. He was married in 1985 to Elizabeth Mary, daughter of Eric Marsden OBE of Stourpaine Manor, Blandford.

== Conservative politics ==
Since 1945, Mother and Baby Homes (otherwise known as maternity homes) had been places for the poor to wean their offspring. She was appointed governor of the one in Cambridge, and moved to Cambridge where her voluntary work continued. The United Cambridge Hospital Board, the Cambridge Social Services Committee, and the Cambridge Folk Museum all received her patronage. She was a member of the Rheumatism and Arthritis Association, which began serious research work on debilitation at Cambridge laboratories.

In 1963, she was elected as councillor for Trumpington on Cambridge City Council. In 1971–2, she served as Mayor of Cambridge which she described as a "folderol". That office was followed by appointment to the Cambridge bench as a justice of the peace from 1972. She granted the Freedom of Cambridge to RAF Oakington, revived the town's market, installed a travel centre, and built an entrance hall to the railway station. She opened the Elizabeth Way Bridge with former Conservative cabinet minister Rab Butler, High Steward of Cambridge University. She arranged to "twin" Cambridge with three other great university cities, Florence, Heidelberg and Split. She raised funds for Addenbrooke's Hospital and the Indo-Pakistan War Relief Fund, and undertook a swimathon.

Before the local government and administration of justice re-organisation, it was usual for the upper classes to sit on the bench as a matter of public duty. She re-entered politics in 1973, when she was elected to Cambridgeshire County Council for the Trumpington division but resigned in 1975 over the rapist scandal. She sought election to Parliament, and reached the short list for the Isle of Ely for the October 1974 election. (Dr Thomas Stuttaford was selected instead and lost to Clement Freud.) That year marked a watershed in her political career. Stepping up a gear, she moved into a visibly national profile: her son was by now fully grown and starting a career. Continuing a gradual move up the career ladder into public life, Barker matured into a serious-minded public figure; she was appointed to the Board of Visitors of the women's gaol attached to Pentonville Prison in London. She was one of the few who could get along well with the leader of her party, Margaret Thatcher.

In addition, the former councillor was appointed by the Labour government to the Mental Health Tribunal, before community care had been introduced. The following year, 1976, she was made a General Commissioner for Taxes, based on a competent showing with the city's finances. She served on various public bodies, including chair of the Air Transport Users Committee (1979–80). One of the first questions she asked in the Lords was about improving the airmail service, in which area she was regarded an expert. The binding Official Secrets clause was repealed, privatisation followed, and profitability indexation restored to Air Mail services.

Her interest in women's affairs became known for all the world to see when Thatcher became prime minister. Appointed as UK Representative to the UN Commission on the Status of Women it was her role to promote women's equality, marriage and divorce, healthcare, child-rearing, and human rights. She had an extensive address book in the United States; managing British interests on the Council in New York gave her a social profile that befitted her class status and ambition, but was nonetheless useful networking for the British Government. Belated recognition came from a Labour peeress:

On a different canvas, the noble Baroness, Lady Trumpington, then UK representative at the UN Commission on the Status of Women, helped to unite the international voice of women through her irresistible humour and sense of fun. It was good to be so involved in those days.

Sent by Mrs Thatcher to Copenhagen, she headed a delegation to UK's first female ambassador, Anne Warburton. At the UN she crossed the floor to greet Suzanne Mubarak, who made a brave speech for advancing peace in the Middle East.

Lady Trumpington was a steward of Folkestone Racecourse (1980–92). In 1980, she was made an Honorary Fellow of Lucy Cavendish College, Cambridge. She was a member of the Farmers' Club and Grillion's Club in London.

== Ministerial office from the Lords ==
In almost her first debate she found herself on two sides of the same debate: discussing Clause no.23 amendment sponsored by Duke of Norfolk to Education Bill No. 2 1980. In June 1983, she joined the Lords Works of Art Committee. She became a resident expert on the committee, where she sat until 2010.

On leaving the UN post and entering the House of Lords, she was introduced as a Baroness-in-waiting from 1983 to 1985. Thatcher recognised her capabilities when she was given a ministerial post. Despite being in the Lords as Parliamentary Under-Secretary of State at the Department of Health and Social Security from 1985 to 1987, during which time she smoked cigarettes, and in spite of a deep concern for women's mental health with numerous charities, she would in perpetuum champion the cause of smokers to do what they wanted. A stubborn streak of wilful independence was typical of the Thatcherite in her, which she never lost up until her final verbatim speech in the Lords.

Moving to the Ministry of Agriculture, which suited her temperament better than social security, at the height of the Thatcher boom period from 1987 to 1989, she was made Parliamentary Under-Secretary. She was promoted to number two at the ministry in 1989 when the Prime Minister was still creating hereditary peerages; she valued her friendship and support. She continued until 1992, serving during John Major's administration as Minister of State at the Ministry of Agriculture, Fisheries and Food, when at age 69 she was the oldest female minister ever.

Her last role was once again as a Baroness-in-waiting to the Queen from 1992 to 1997, when a change of government ended her career. Acting in the capacity as a whip and a courtier, she felt compelled to attend at the bedside of Sally Mugabe in a London Hospital. She also received Mohammed Zahir Shah, the last king of Afghanistan, on behalf of the Queen. On several occasions during the 1990s, Lady Trumpington became acquainted with the New Labour opposition leaders, Tony Blair and Gordon Brown at Court. She was one of the few officials on hand in 1990 to recognise the new State of Mongolia, subsequently travelling to Ulan Bator to deal with KGB-backed Russian investors on a construction project.

Under the New Labour government Trumpington was created an Extraordinary Baroness-in-Waiting from 1998, given her many years of experience at Court. During the Labour government, she was consistently on the side of traditionalists. She voted often in favour of university tuition fees and raising the cap to £9,000; opposed constitutional reform, telling the Lords that she believed in the first-past-the-post system; and against the ban on fox hunting. Lady Trumpington was broadly in favour of Brexit, particularly the diminution of EU integration. She voted against the bill to make a referendum necessary to transfer powers back from EU to UK. Trumpington remained a principled opponent of soft measures on crime. Consistently supportive of tough measures, she was appointed Trustee of Crimestoppers in 2004. This tied in closely with ongoing visitations to Pentonville Prison, as Crimestoppers' emphasis was specific to schoolchildren and youth offending. She opposed "walking free" and community sentencing; her disarming charm when discoursing about conditions in Britain's jails alerted the Lords perspective on the significance of public participation in crime reduction initiatives.

Her sense of order, propriety and taste got her into trouble: mocked by a Labour peeress for commenting on the drab and dishevelled appearance of the House of Lords, she more than once appeared a martinet for insisting on "dress code". On another occasion she gave a V-sign to Lord King of Bridgwater in the House of Lords, 10 November 2011 when he referred to her advanced age during a Remembrance Day debate.

When she tried to debate the "plight of rural veterinary practices", the peeress pretended to be deaf: she had long railed against the most absurd forms of political correctness. In 2000–01, she was made President of the South of England Agricultural Show, taking the opportunity to promote animal health, a cause for which she had in 1995 been awarded an Honorary Membership of the British Veterinary Association, in response to her work in that ministry. Declining rural practices was caused directly by the government's farming policies; the yawning gap between policy and practice exposed weaknesses in the EFRACOM report. She had initiated the debate on 24 June 2004, and was widely praised for so doing. Throughout her career, she was notable for having raised uncomfortable truths about topics most politicians have avoided, such as the plight of women in prisons, or the fate of single mothers with mental health issues.

In December 2012, she acknowledged the campaign for the government to give official recognition to the work of Alan Turing. In a letter to the Daily Telegraph, the signatories, including Stephen Hawking, the physicist; Lord Rees, the astronomer royal; and Sir Paul Nurse, the president of the Royal Society, called on Prime Minister David Cameron to support a pardon for Turing's 1952 conviction for homosexuality. Trumpington worked at Bletchley Park during the war at the same time as Turing, commenting only on his presence.

She retired from the House of Lords on 24 October 2017, one day after her 95th birthday.

== Honours ==
Arms of Jean Barker (née Campbell-Harris), Baroness Trumpington: Gyronny of eight ermine and azure, three hedgehogs or. Within a lozenge-shaped shield appropriate for a female armiger. Possibly her paternal arms, hedgehogs (French: hérisson) being commonly adopted as canting arms by persons surnamed Harris, the gyronny field being a reference to the arms of the Scottish Clan Campbell (with differenced tinctures)

Trumpington was appointed an Officer of the National Order of Merit by the French Republic. On 4 February 1980 she was created a life peer, choosing the title Baroness Trumpington, of Sandwich in the County of Kent. She was appointed a Dame Commander of the Royal Victorian Order in 2005. Leaving government she was granted an Honorary Fellowship of the Royal College of Pathologists (FRCPath). Two years later she was recognised for her voluntary activities as Honorary Associate of the Royal College of Volunteer Services (ARCVS).

== Media ==
As a castaway on Desert Island Discs in 1990 she chose as her luxury item the Crown Jewels in order to maximise her chances of being rescued.

In 2011, she published a jaunty ghost-written memoir, Coming Up Trumps. In the preface, she wrote she was persuaded by huge demands from her friends and colleagues to have an autobiography published.

On 30 November 2012, Trumpington was a guest panellist on the BBC TV's satirical news quiz Have I Got News for You; at the age of 90 she was the oldest guest to have appeared on the programme. In December 2013 she was a guest on BBC Three chat show Backchat with Jack and Michael Whitehall. In 2014 she was a guest judge in the finals of the Great British Menu.

At the end of December 2017, she was one of the guest editors for BBC Radio 4's prestigious Today programme. Topics she chose to highlight included her long-standing campaign to legalise brothels; Sangita Myska was tasked with interviewing a brothel keeper, a sex worker, and a woman who had escaped the sex industry. Another topic was living with incurable diseases such as Crohn's. John Humphrys interviewed her about her life and career, when she credited good luck for much of her success.

She was referenced as suffering from the fictional "Slimmels disease" in the spoof news and current affairs satire The Day Today.

== Later life ==
Lady Trumpington was widowed in 1988. In later interviews with The Guardian she described enjoying her grandchildren. She also enjoyed contract bridge, needlepoint and horse racing. In January 2010, while she was out, her flat in Battersea caught fire; her possessions were badly damaged.

She died in Chelsea, London, on 26 November 2018. Her death was confirmed by her son, Adam Barker, on Twitter later that night. He wrote: "My mother passed away this afternoon in her sleep ... she had a bloody good innings."
