= Freyberg Pool =

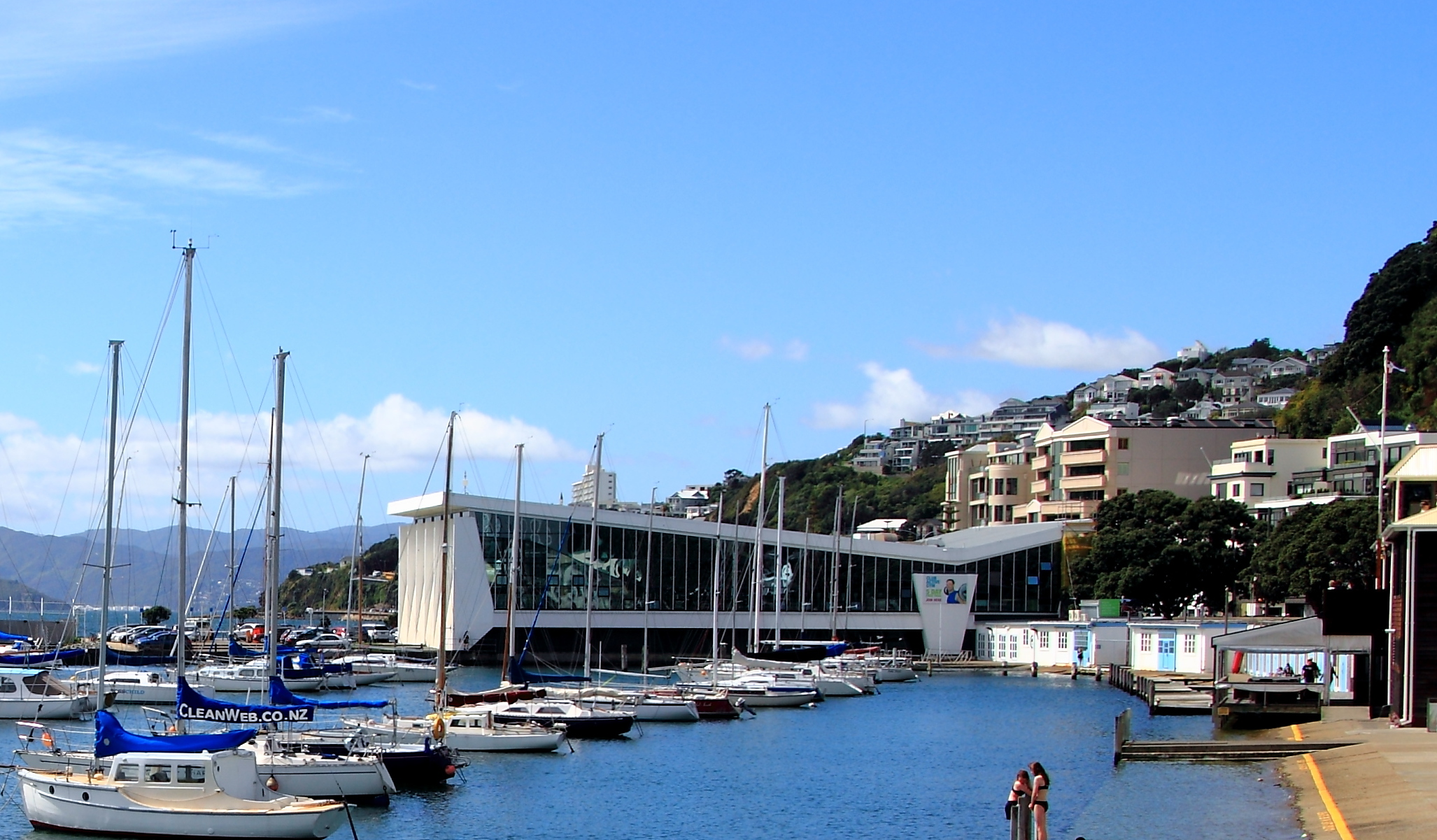
- Freyberg Pool from the boat harbour
- Interactive map of the Freyberg Pool area

General information
- Architectural style: Modernist
- Location: Wellington, New Zealand
- Coordinates: 41.291011°S 174.790056°E
- Completed: 1963

Design and construction
- Architect: Jason Smith
- Awards and prizes: NZIA National Award Winner 2011

Heritage New Zealand – Category 1

Freyberg Pool is a public indoor swimming pool on Wellington Harbour, New Zealand. The main pool is 33 metres (108 ft) long. It is named for Bernard Freyberg, a World War I Victoria Cross recipient and Governor-General of New Zealand.

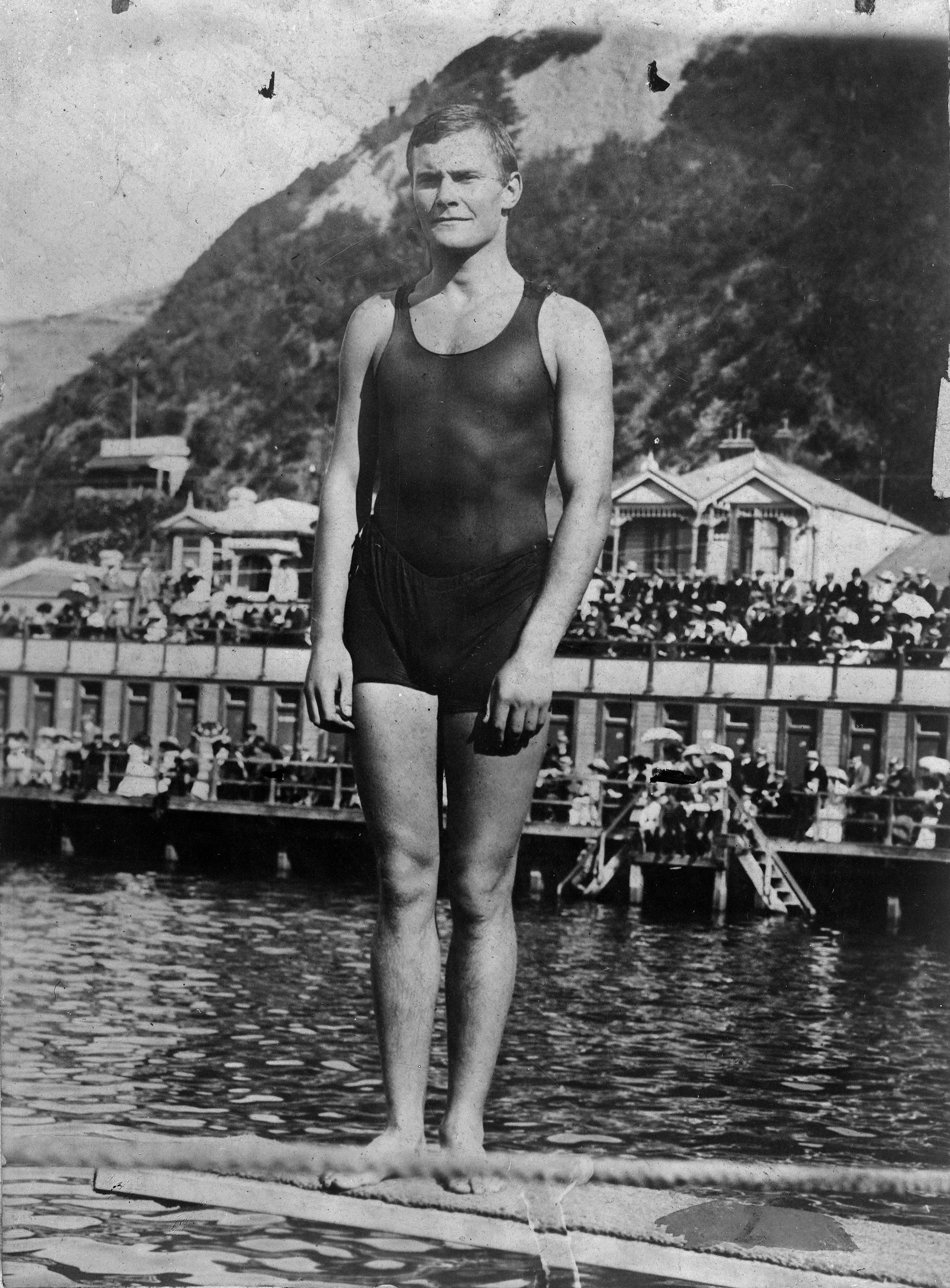
Bernard Freyberg c. 1904. at Te Aro Baths now the site of The Freyberg Pool

A strong swimmer, he won the New Zealand 100-yards championship in 1906 and 1910. Freyberg died in 1963, the year the pool was opened, so it was decided to name it after him as he had trained at Te Aro baths which was previously at the site.

The building is classified as a "Category I" ("places of 'special or outstanding historical or cultural heritage significance or value'") historic place by the New Zealand Historic Places Trust.

In 2011, along with the Michael Fowler Centre, it won an NZIA Enduring Architecture Award.
