= Barbara Freyberg, Baroness Freyberg =

British peeress

Barbara Freyberg
- Born: 14 June 1887
- Died: 24 September 1973 (aged 86); Chelsea Square. London
- Burial place: St Martha's Hill
- Military career
- Branch: Women's Auxiliary Army Corps (New Zealand)
- Awards: GBE, DStJ

Lady Barbara Freyberg, Baroness Freyberg, (née Jekyll, formerly McLaren; 14 June 1887 – 24 September 1973) GBE, DStJ was a British peeress and member of the "Tuis", Women's War Service Auxiliary during World War II.

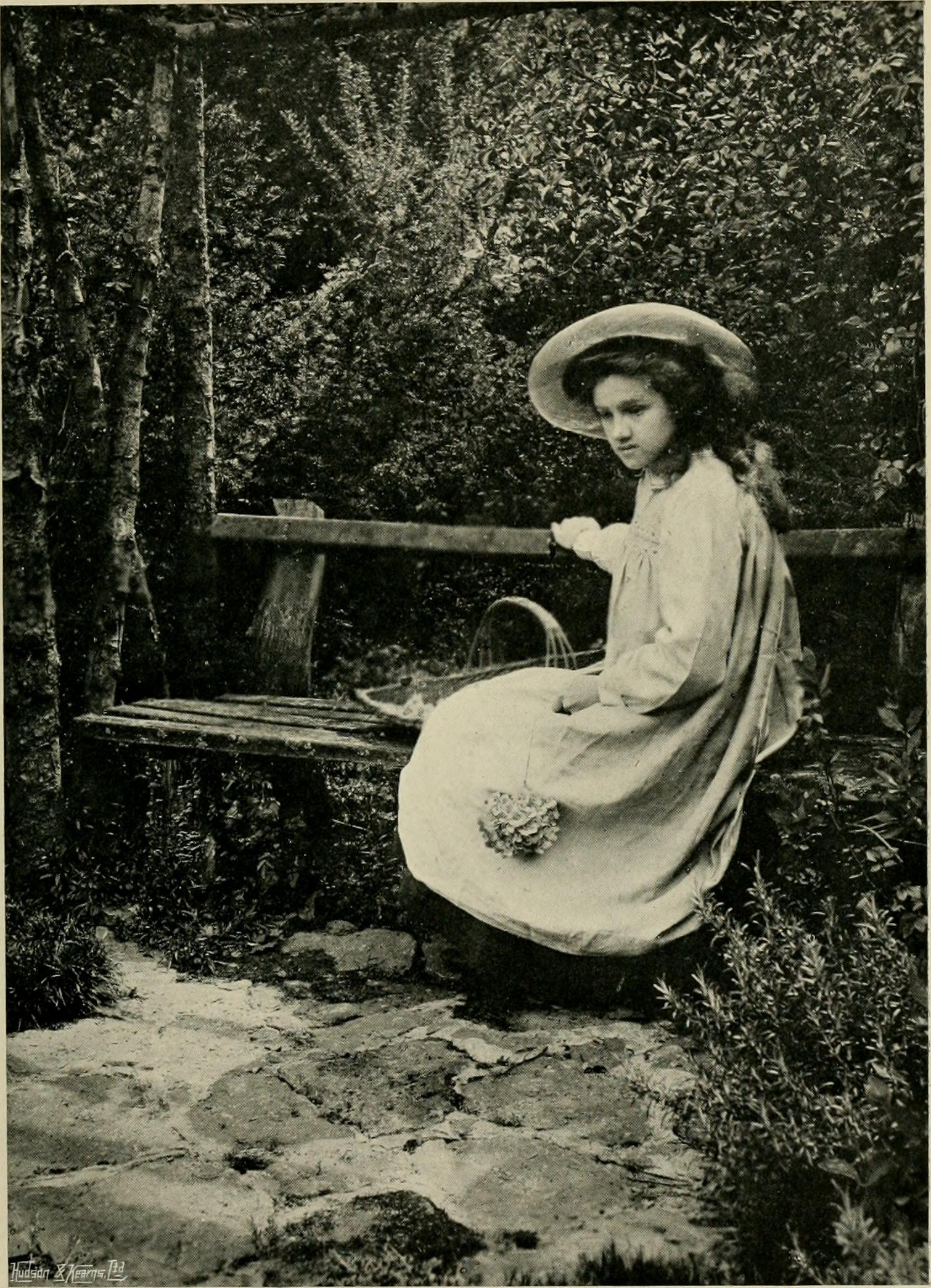
Barbara Jekyll photographed by Gertrude Jekyll, published in Children and Gardens (1908)

== Life ==
Born as Barbara Jekyll, she was a daughter of Colonel Sir Herbert Jekyll, KCMG and his wife, Dame Agnes Graham Jekyll, DBE.

On 20 July 1911, she married Hon. Francis Walter Stafford McLaren, the-then Liberal MP for Spalding and the second son of the 1st Baron Aberconway. They had two sons, Major Martin John McLaren (11 January 1914 – 27 July 1979) and Guy Lewis Ian McLaren (8 November 1915 – 18 August 1978). Francis, a Royal Flying Corps officer, was killed in a flying accident 1917. As a result, and out of a desire to retain her connection with the town, Barbara was instrumental in the construction of Spalding War Memorial. She commissioned Sir Edwin Lutyens through her aunt, Gertrude Jekyll—a friend and collaborator of Lutyens. She donated £1,000 towards the cost of the memorial and attended the unveiling ceremony on 9 June 1922.

On 14 June 1922 Barbara married her second husband, Bernard Cyril Freyberg (later Baron Freyberg), at St. Martha-on-the-Hill, near Guildford, Surrey. They had one son: Paul Richard Freyberg, 2nd Baron Freyberg (27 May 1923 – 26 May 1993).

== World War II ==
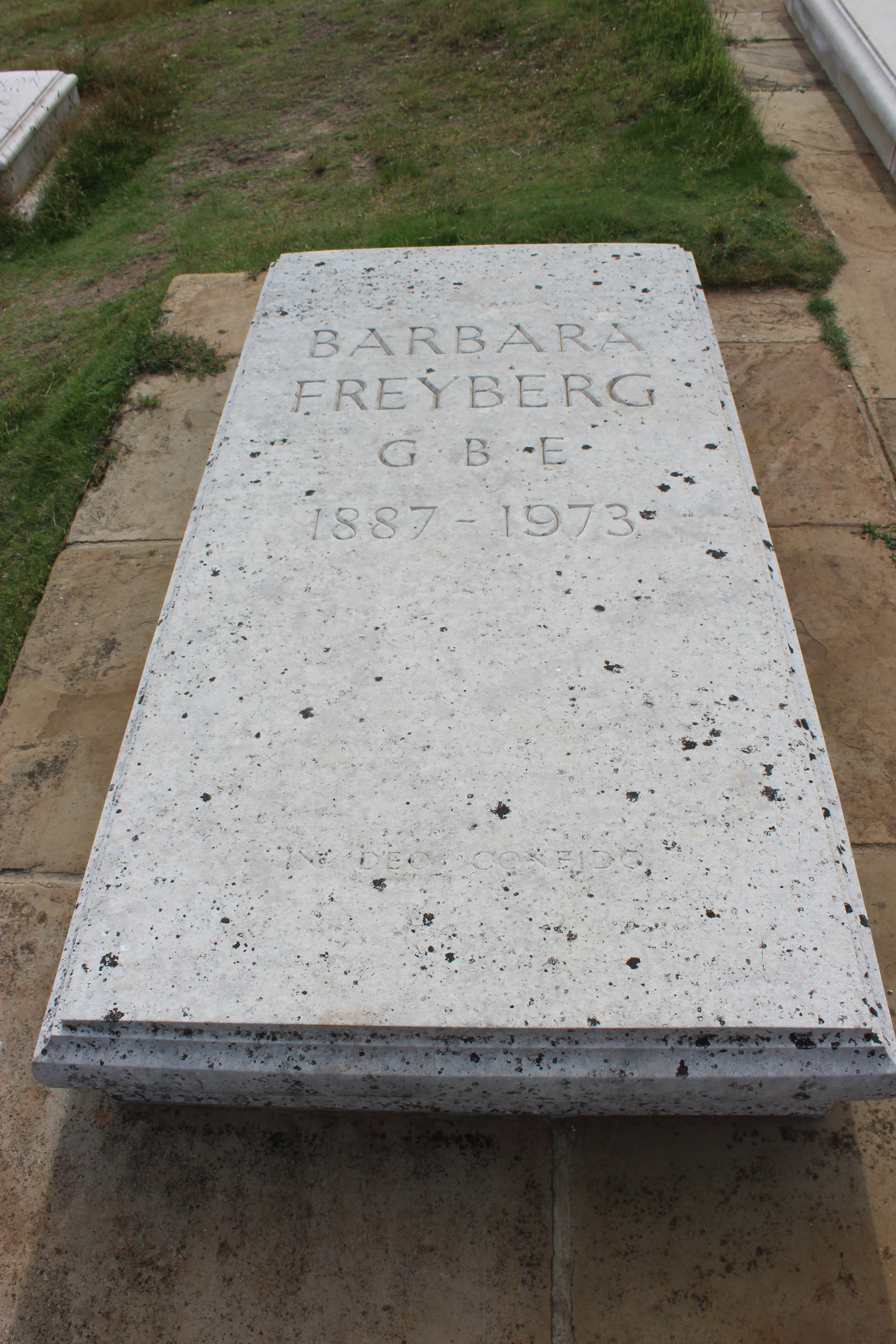
Grave in the churchyard of St Martha on the Hill near Guildford, Surrey

Lady Freyberg made a number of significant contributions during the Second World War, working with the Welfare Branch of the Second New Zealand Expeditionary Force. She was a member of the New Zealand Women's Army Auxiliary Corps, leading the 'Tuis' who managed the New Zealand Forces club. The Club and the Tuis provided a place of solace and feeling of home for all New Zealand troops stationed across London, the Middle East and Italy. She also supported wounded soldiers in Cairo and kept families back in New Zealand informed through letters of condolence.

Lady Freyberg was mentioned in dispatches and in 1943, was appointed an Officer of the Order of the British Empire (OBE).

When her husband's term as Governor-General of New Zealand ended in 1952, Lady Freyberg was awarded the GBE in the 1953 New Year Honours.

She later became the Patroness of the Returned Army Nurses Association.

== Death ==
She died in 1973 at 65 Chelsea Square, London SW3. She was interred in the churchyard of Saint Martha on the Hill in Guildford, Surrey, alongside her second husband (and later her son).
