= Valerian Freyberg, 3rd Baron Freyberg =

British hereditary peer (born 1970)

The Right Honourable The Lord Freyberg
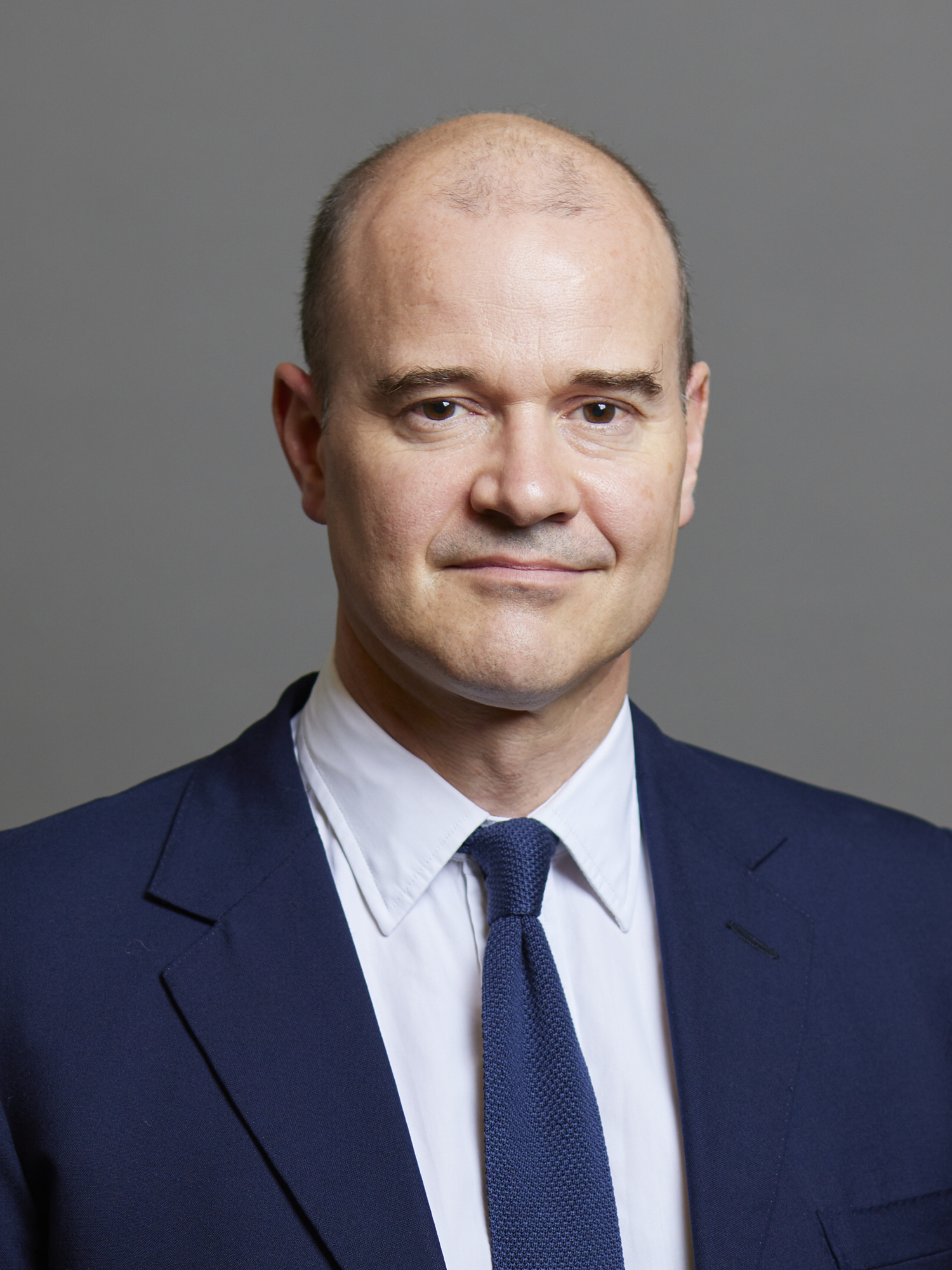

Member of the House of Lords
- Lord Temporal
- Hereditary peerage 7 March 1994 – 11 November 1999
- Preceded by: The 2nd Baron Freyberg
- Succeeded by: Seat abolished
- Elected Hereditary Peer; 11 November 1999 – 29 April 2026
- Election: 1999
- Preceded by: Seat established
- Succeeded by: Seat abolished

Personal details
- Born: 15 December 1970 (age 55)
- Party: None (crossbencher)
- Education: Camberwell College of Arts

Valerian Bernard Freyberg, 3rd Baron Freyberg (born 15 December 1970) is a British hereditary peer and former member of the House of Lords, who sat as a crossbencher.

== Biography ==
Freyberg was born on 15 December 1970 to Paul Freyberg, 2nd Baron Freyberg and Ivry Perronelle Katharine (née Guild). Schooled at Eton College, subsequently he studied at Camberwell College of Arts, where he graduated with a Bachelor of Arts in 1994. He later studied fine art at the Slade School of Fine Art, graduating with a Master of Arts (MA) degree in 2006.

He succeeded his father as Baron Freyberg in 1993. On 12 July 1994, he took his seat in the House of Lords as a hereditary peer, sitting as a non-political crossbencher. He made his maiden speech on 24 January 1995. He was one of the 90 hereditary peers elected (by other hereditary peers) to sit in the House of Lords after the House of Lords Act 1999. He was a member of the Lords' Works of Art Committee from 23 November 1999 to 7 November 2002.

Peerage of the United Kingdom
Preceded by Paul Freyberg	Baron Freyberg; 1993–present Member of the House of Lords (1994–1999)	Incumbent
Parliament of the United Kingdom
New office created by the House of Lords Act 1999	Elected hereditary peer to the House of Lords under the House of Lords Act 1999; 1999–2026	Office abolished under the House of Lords (Hereditary Peers) Act 2026
