= Freyberg Place =

Urban square in Auckland, New Zealand

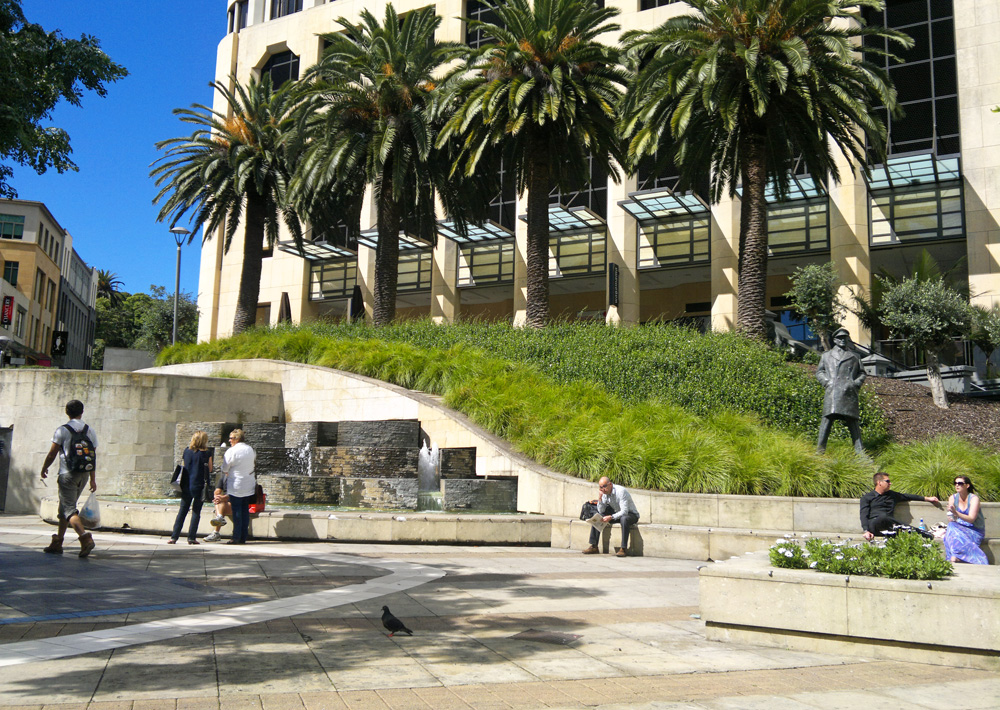
- Freyberg Place in 2012 (pre-renovation), looking toward the Metropolis building
- Interactive map of Freyberg Place
- Type: Town square
- Location: Auckland, New Zealand
- Coordinates: 36.84778°S 174.76684°E
- Created: 1946
- Operator: Auckland Council

Freyberg Place (also known as Freyberg Square) is a small square located in Auckland, New Zealand. It is named after Baron Freyberg who was a prominent soldier and the first New Zealand-raised Governor-General of New Zealand.

== History ==
The square was first opened in 1946, and the decision to name it Freyberg Place was befitting, given that it is a small square and Freyberg's nickname was "Tiny".

The square underwent significant renovations, costing $4 million, and was reopened on 15 September 2017. It now contains a pōhutukawa tree, some nīkau palms and many concrete steps which double as seating.

Contained within the square is an ornamental fountain and statue of Baron Freyberg in his World War 2 attire.

After the renovation, the road that traversed the square was made into a shared space. Later, in 2018, it was proposed that this be converted completely to a pedestrian mall with bollard access available to emergency vehicles only.

== Surroundings ==
Freyberg Place is located between High St and O'Connell St, near the centre of Auckland's CBD.

It is adjacent to Chancery Square and serves as frontage to the Ellen Melville Centre which was opened in 1962. One the other side of the square, there is the Metropolis building.

== See also ==
- Heart of the City page for Freyberg Place
