= Paul Freyberg, 2nd Baron Freyberg =

British soldier and peer

The Right Honourable The Lord Freyberg OBE MC

Member of the House of Lords Lord Temporal
- In office 4 July 1963 – 26 May 1993; Hereditary peerage
- Preceded by: The 1st Lord Freyberg
- Succeeded by: The 3rd Lord Freyberg

Personal details
- Born: 27 May 1923
- Died: 26 May 1993 (aged 69)
- Education: Eton College

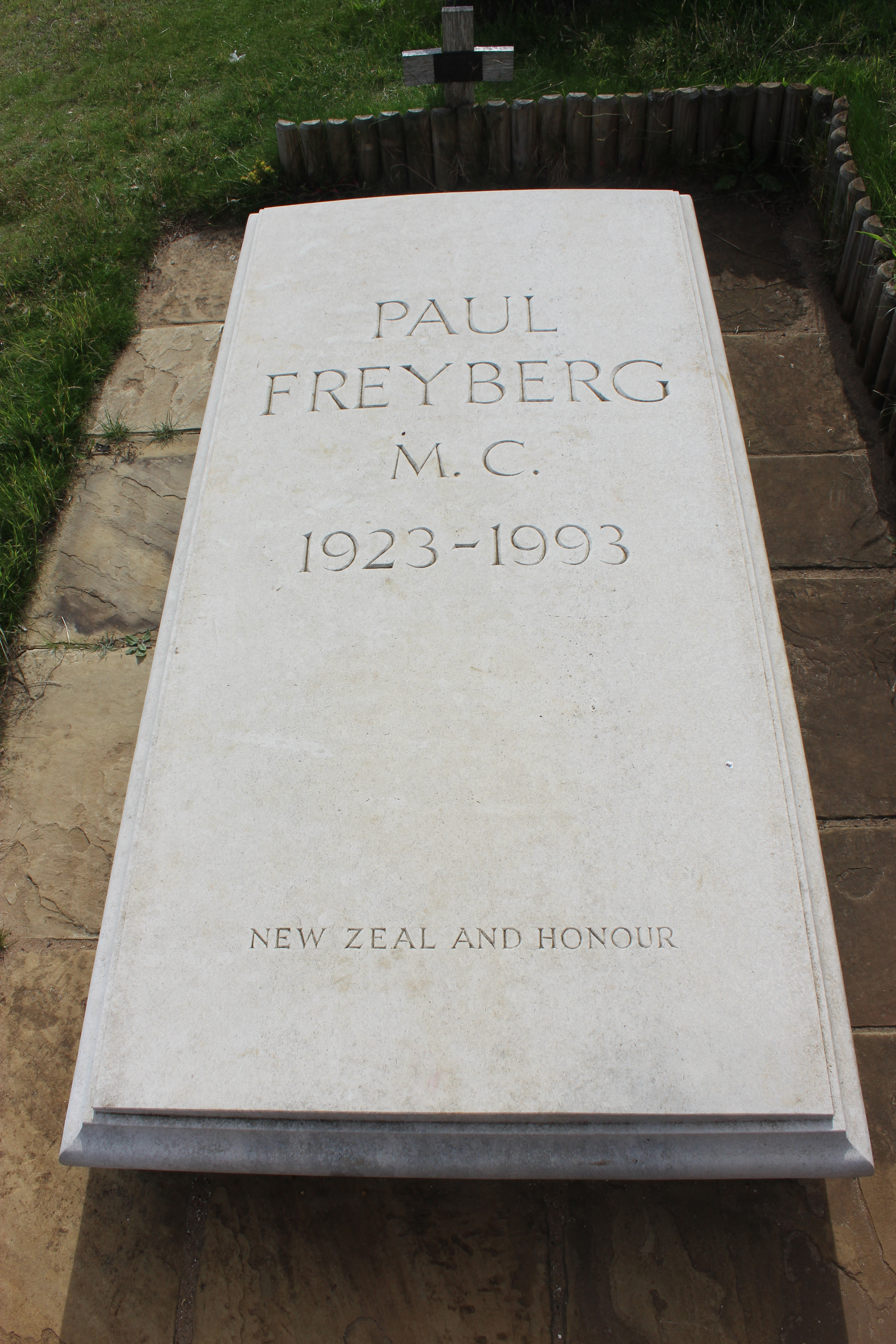
Grave in the churchyard of St Martha on the Hill near Guildford, Surrey

Colonel Paul Richard Freyberg, 2nd Baron Freyberg, OBE, MC (27 May 1923 – 26 May 1993) was a British soldier and peer.

Born in Paddington, London, was the son of Lieutenant General Bernard Freyberg and his wife Barbara McLaren. Barbara was the widow of Hon. Francis Walter Stafford McLaren and had had two sons, Martin John McLaren and Guy Lewis Ian McLaren, who were thus half-brothers to Paul Freyberg. Paul was educated at Eton College, Berkshire. He became a lieutenant colonel in the Grenadier Guards.

During the Second World War, he served with the 2nd New Zealand Division in Greece in 1941 and the Long Range Desert Group in the Middle East 1941–42, then with the Grenadier Guards in Tunisia and Italy 1942–45. Postwar he was in the British Army of the Rhine 1950–51 and other postings and the Ministry of Defence. He was commander of the Honourable Artillery Company, Infantry Battalion between 1965 and 1968. He was awarded the Military Cross in 1943 and appointed an Officer of the Order of the British Empire in the 1965 Birthday Honours.

Freyberg married Ivry Perronelle Katharine Guild in 1960. He succeeded to his father's title in 1963 and took his seat in the House of Lords on 15 January 1964.

Paul Freyberg was the author of the authorised biography of his father, Bernard Freyberg V.C.: Soldier of Two Nations, which was published in 1991.

Peerage of the United Kingdom
Preceded by Bernard Freyberg	Baron Freyberg; 1963–1993	Succeeded by Valerian Freyberg
