= Bernard Freyberg, 1st Baron Freyberg =

New Zealand soldier and viceroy (1889–1963)

Lieutenant-General The Right Honourable The Lord Freyberg VC GCMG KCB KBE DSO & Three Bars KStJ
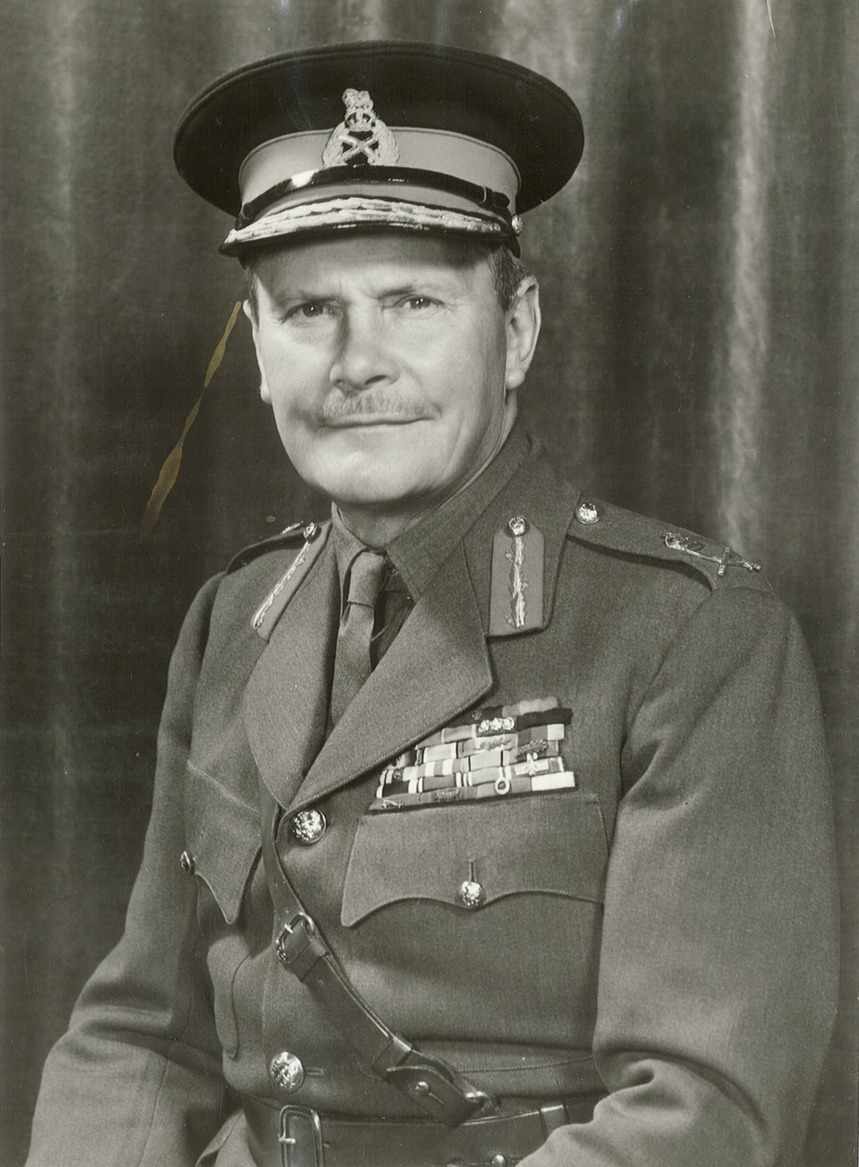
- Freyberg in 1952

7th Governor-General of New Zealand
- In office 17 June 1946 – 15 August 1952
- Monarchs: George VI; Elizabeth II
- Prime Minister: Peter Fraser; Sidney Holland
- Preceded by: Sir Cyril Newall
- Succeeded by: Sir Willoughby Norrie

Member of the House of Lords Lord Temporal
- In office 19 October 1951 – 4 July 1963
- Preceded by: Peerage created
- Succeeded by: The 2nd Lord Freyberg

Personal details
- Born: 21 March 1889 Richmond, Surrey, England
- Died: 4 July 1963 (aged 74) Windsor, Berkshire, England
- Party: Liberal
- Nickname: "Tiny" (Note: "The name 'Tiny' was given to Bernard as a boy, no doubt because he was the youngest – and at one stage the smallest – of a tall family; it stuck to him as he became a tall youth of six foot one and a half; and he continued to be referred to as 'Tiny' by New Zealanders, even as a General on the battlefields of the Second World War".)

Military service
- Allegiance: United Kingdom (1914–1937); New Zealand (1939–1945)
- Branch/service: Royal Naval Volunteer Reserve; British Army; New Zealand Military Forces
- Years of service: 1914–1937; 1939–1945
- Rank: Lieutenant-General
- Unit: Queen's Royal Regiment (West Surrey); Grenadier Guards; Manchester Regiment
- Commands: X Corps (1943); 2nd New Zealand Division (1939–1945); 2nd New Zealand Expeditionary Force (1939–1945); Salisbury Plain Area (1939); 1st Battalion, Manchester Regiment (1929–1931); 88th Brigade (1917–1918); 173rd (3/1st London) Brigade (1917)
- Battles/wars: First World War; Battle of the Somme; Second World War; German invasion of Greece; Battle of Crete; North African campaign; Western Desert campaign; Second Battle of El Alamein; Italian campaign; Second Battle of Monte Cassino; Trieste operation
- Awards: Victoria Cross; Knight Grand Cross of the Order of St Michael and St George; Knight Commander of the Order of the Bath; Knight Commander of the Order of the British Empire; Companion of the Distinguished Service Order & Three Bars; Mentioned in Despatches (6); Knight of the Venerable Order of St. John; Croix de Guerre (France); Legion of Merit (United States); Grand Commander with Swords of the Order of George I (Greece); Cross of Valour (Greece); War Cross (Greece)

Lieutenant-General Bernard Cyril Freyberg, 1st Baron Freyberg, VC, GCMG, KCB, KBE, DSO & Three Bars, KStJ (21 March 1889 – 4 July 1963) was a British-born New Zealand soldier and Victoria Cross recipient, who served as the 7th governor-general of New Zealand from 1946 to 1952 - the first to have been raised and educated in New Zealand.

Freyberg served as an officer in the British Army during the First World War. He took part in the beach landings during the Gallipoli campaign and was the youngest general in the British Army during the First World War, later serving on the Western Front, where he was decorated with the Victoria Cross and appointed a Companion of the Distinguished Service Order with three bars, making him one of the most highly decorated British Empire soldiers of the First World War. He liked to be in the thick of the action: Winston Churchill called him "the Salamander" due to his ability to pass through fire unharmed.

During the Second World War, he commanded the New Zealand Expeditionary Force in the Battle of Crete, the North African campaign and the Italian campaign. Freyberg was involved in the Allied defeat in the Battle of Greece, defeated again as the Allied commander in the Battle of Crete and performed successfully in the fighting in North Africa, commanding the 2nd New Zealand Division, including during the Second Battle of El Alamein and in the subsequent Tunisian campaign.

In Italy, he was defeated again at the Second Battle of Cassino as a corps commander but later relieved Padua and Venice and was one of the first to enter Trieste, where he confronted Josip Broz Tito's Yugoslav Partisans. By the end of the Second World War, Freyberg had spent ten and a half years fighting the Germans.

== Early life ==
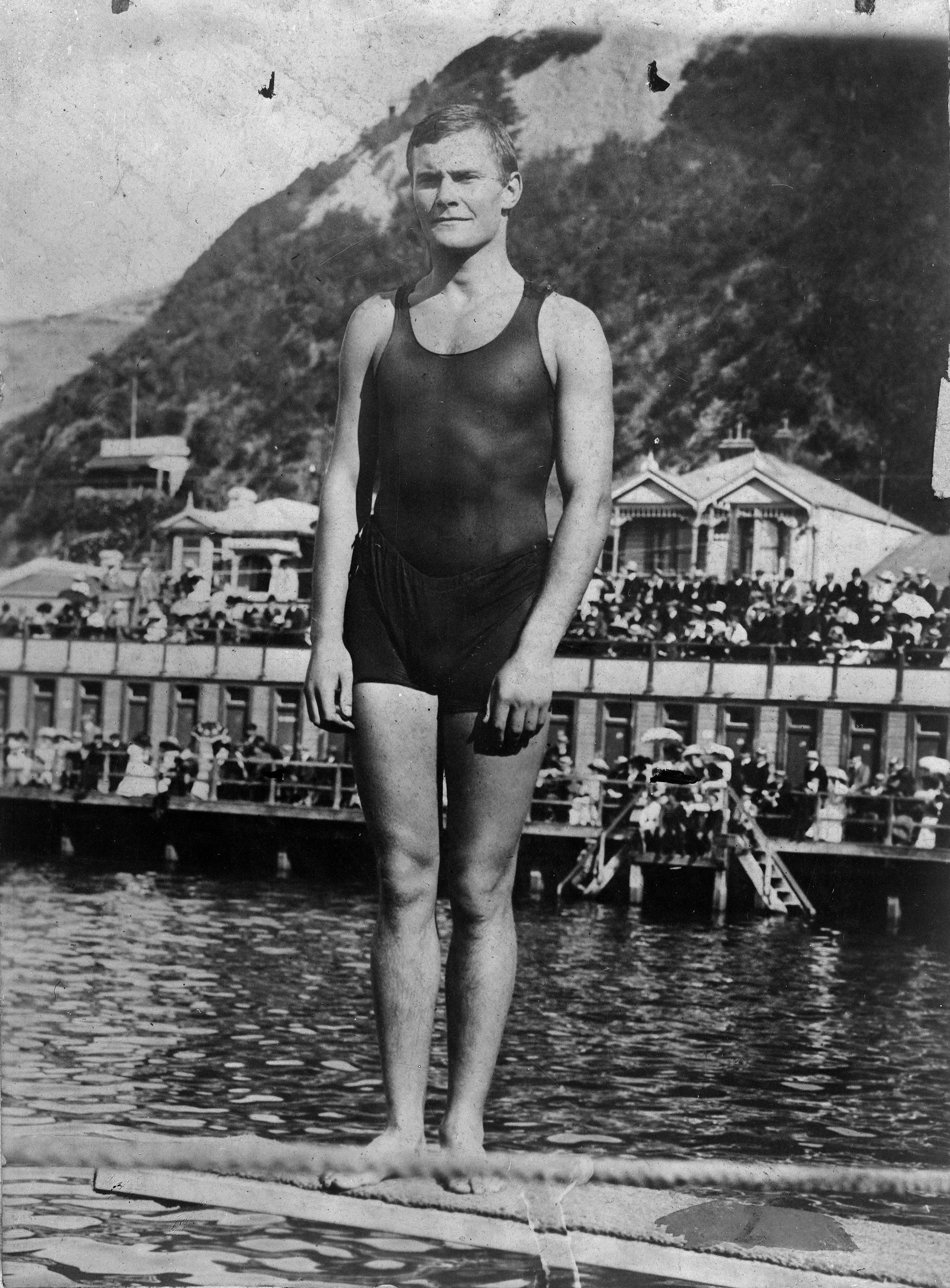
Bernard Freyberg c. 1904. at Te Aro Baths, now the site of The Freyberg Pool

The youngest of five children, all boys, Freyberg was born at 8 Dynevor Road, Richmond, Surrey, to James Freyberg and his second wife, Julia (née Hamilton). He was of partial Austrian-German descent. At the age of two, he migrated to New Zealand with his parents.

Freyburg attended Wellington College from 1897 to 1904. A strong swimmer, he won the New Zealand 100-yards championship in 1906 and 1910.

Freyberg joined the New Zealand Territorial Army, and in 1911 was a Second Lieutenant serving in C Company of the Hauraki Regiment. This company was based at Annandale, near Morrinsville, and during this time Freyberg served as locum for a local dentist. On 18 January 1912, Freyberg was gazetted into the 6th Hauraki Regiment. Freyberg later resigned his commission and moved to Levin.

In March 1914 Freyberg left New Zealand for California. A 1942 Life magazine article claimed that he went to San Francisco and Mexico around this time and was a captain under Pancho Villa during the Mexican Revolution. Upon hearing of the outbreak of the First World War in August 1914, he travelled to Britain via Los Angeles (where he won a swimming competition) and New York (where he won a prizefight), to earn money to cross the United States and the Atlantic. Recent research indicates, however, that Freyberg never went to Mexico, that he spent most of his time in California as working on an oil field and living in Coalinga, that he left for the war by train from San Francisco, and that he created the Mexico story about himself shortly after arriving in Britain by spinning a yarn to a New Zealand journalist, perhaps hoping that some active service might help to secure a commission in the British forces.

== First World War ==
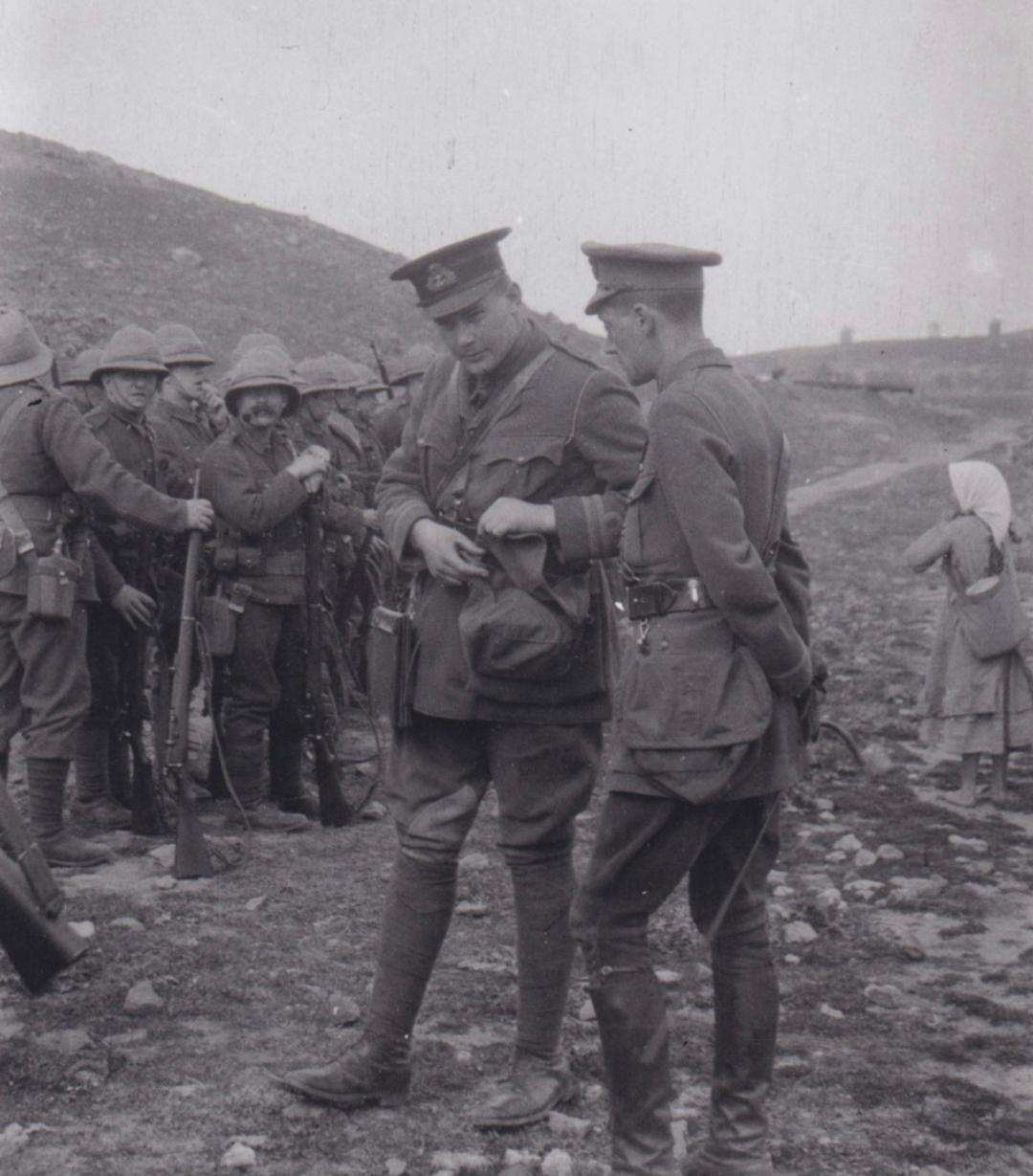
Freyberg (centre, facing camera) at Lemnos, 1915. Photo taken by Rupert Brooke.

Immediately on the outbreak of the First World War Freyberg went to England and volunteered for service. G. S. Richardson arranged for him to join the 7th "Hood" Battalion of the Royal Naval Brigade, and he was on the Belgian front in September 1914. In late 1914 Freyberg met Winston Churchill, then First Lord of the Admiralty, and persuaded him to grant him a Royal Naval Volunteer Reserve commission in the 'Hood' Battalion, part of the 2nd (Royal Naval) Brigade of the newly constituted Royal Naval Division.

In April 1915 Freyberg became involved in the Dardanelles campaign. On the night of 24 April, during the initial landings by Allied troops following the failed naval attempt to force the straits by sea, Freyberg volunteered to swim ashore in the Gulf of Saros. Once ashore, he began lighting flares so as to distract the defending Turkish forces from the real landings taking place at Gallipoli. Despite coming under heavy Turkish fire, he returned safely from this outing and was appointed a Companion of the Distinguished Service Order (DSO). He received serious wounds on several occasions and left the peninsula when his division evacuated in January 1916.

=== Victoria Cross ===
In May 1916 Freyberg was transferred to the British Army as a captain in the Queen's (Royal West Surrey) Regiment. However, he remained with the 'Hood' Battalion as a seconded temporary major and went with them to France.

During the final stages of the Battle of the Somme, when commanding a battalion as a temporary lieutenant-colonel, he so distinguished himself in the capture of Beaucourt village that he was awarded the Victoria Cross (VC). On 13 November 1916 at Beaucourt-sur-Ancre, France, after Freyberg's battalion had carried the initial attack through the enemy's front system of trenches, he rallied and re-formed his own much disorganised men and some others, and led them on a successful assault of the second objective, during which he suffered two wounds, but remained in command and held his ground throughout the day and the following night. When reinforced the next morning, he attacked and captured a strongly fortified village, taking 500 prisoners. Although wounded twice more, the second time severely, Freyberg refused to leave the line until he had issued final instructions. The full citation for the award, published in The London Gazette in December 1916, describes the events as follows:

For most conspicuous bravery and brilliant leading as a Battalion Commander.

By his splendid personal gallantry he carried the initial attack straight through the enemy's front system of trenches. Owing to mist and heavy fire of all descriptions, Lieutenant-Colonel Freyberg's command was much disorganised after the capture of the first objective. He personally rallied and re-formed his men, including men from other units who had become intermixed.

He inspired all with his own contempt of danger. At the appointed time he led his men to the successful assault of the second objective--many prisoners being captured.

During this advance he was twice wounded. He again rallied and re-formed all who were with him, and although unsupported in a very advanced position, he held his ground for the remainder of the day, and throughout the night, under heavy artillery and machine gun fire. When reinforced on the following morning, he organised the attack on a strongly fortified village and showed a fine example of dash in personally leading the assault, capturing the village and five hundred prisoners. In this operation he was again wounded.

Later in the afternoon, he was again wounded severely, but refused to leave the line till he had issued final instructions.

The personality, valour and utter contempt of danger on the part of this single Officer enabled the lodgment in the most advanced objective of the Corps to be permanently held, and on this point d'appui the line was eventually formed.

During his time on the Western Front Freyberg continued to lead by example. His bold leadership had a cost: Freyberg received nine wounds during his service in France, and men who served with him later in his career said hardly a part of his body did not have scars.

Bernard Freyberg in 1919

Freyberg gained promotion to the rank of temporary brigadier general (although he still had the permanent rank of only captain) and took command of the 173rd (3/1st London) Brigade, part of the 58th (2/1st London) Division, in April 1917, which reportedly made him the youngest general officer in the British Army. He was appointed a Companion of the Order of St Michael and St George the same year. In September a shell exploding at his feet inflicted the worst of his many wounds, having "been hit in five places by the heavy shell that had burst at his feet, right through a lung in one place, and in his thigh was a hole the size of a fist". He was evacuated to Bryanston Square Hospital, Westminster, where he remained for the next three months. Initially, it was feared that he would "lose a leg – or even his life".

When he resumed duty in January 1918, the same month in which he was promoted to brevet lieutenant colonel, he took command of the 88th Infantry Brigade, part of the 29th Division, performing with distinction during the German spring offensives of March–April 1918. He won a bar to his DSO in September that year. Freyberg ended the war by leading a cavalry squadron detached from the 7th Dragoon Guards to seize a bridge at Lessines, which was achieved one minute before the armistice with Germany came into effect, thus earning him a second bar to the DSO. By the end of the war, Freyberg had added the French Croix de Guerre to his name, as well receiving five mentions in despatches after his escapade at Saros. With his VC and three DSOs, he ranked among the most highly decorated British Empire soldiers of the First World War.

== Interbellum ==
Early in 1919 Freyberg was granted a Regular Army commission in the Grenadier Guards and settled into peacetime soldiering, as well as attempts to swim the English Channel. He attended the Staff College, Camberley from 1920 to 1921. From 1921 to 1925 he was a staff officer in the headquarters of the 44th (Home Counties) Division. He suffered health problems arising from his many wounds, and as part of his convalescence he visited New Zealand in 1921.

On 14 June 1922 he married Barbara McLaren (a daughter of Sir Herbert and Dame Agnes Jekyll, and the widow of the Honourable Francis McLaren) at St Martha on the Hill in Surrey. Barbara had two children from her previous marriage; she and Freyberg later had a son, Paul (1923–1993).

In the general election of 1922 he stood unsuccessfully (coming second) as a Liberal candidate for Cardiff South.

General election 1922: Cardiff South
Party	Candidate	Votes	%	±%
Unionist	Sir James Herbert Cory	7,929	36.4	−12.0
Liberal	Bernard Cyril Freyberg	6,996	32.2	+7.0
Labour	David Graham Pole	6,831	31.9	+5.6
Majority		933	4.2	−17.9
Turnout		21,756	74.9	+17.1
Unionist hold		Swing	-9.5	

He represented New Zealand on the International Olympic Committee in 1928–30. Promoted to the permanent rank of major in 1927 (having been a substantive captain since 1916), he held a GSO2 staff appointment at Headquarters, Eastern Command until February 1929 when he was transferred to the Manchester Regiment and promoted to lieutenant-colonel upon being appointed to command the 1st Battalion, Manchester Regiment.

In March 1931 he was promoted colonel (with seniority backdated to 1922) and was appointed Assistant Quartermaster General of Southern Command. In 1933 he wrote A Study of Unit Administration, which became a staff college textbook on quarter-masters' logistics; it went into a second edition in 1940.

In September 1933 he moved to a GSO1 posting at the War Office before being promoted major-general in July 1934. With this promotion, at age 45, he seemed headed for the highest echelons of the army. However, medical examinations prior to a posting in India revealed a heart problem. Despite strenuous efforts to surmount this, Freyberg, who was made a Companion of the Order of the Bath in 1936, was obliged to retire on 16 October 1937.

== Second World War ==
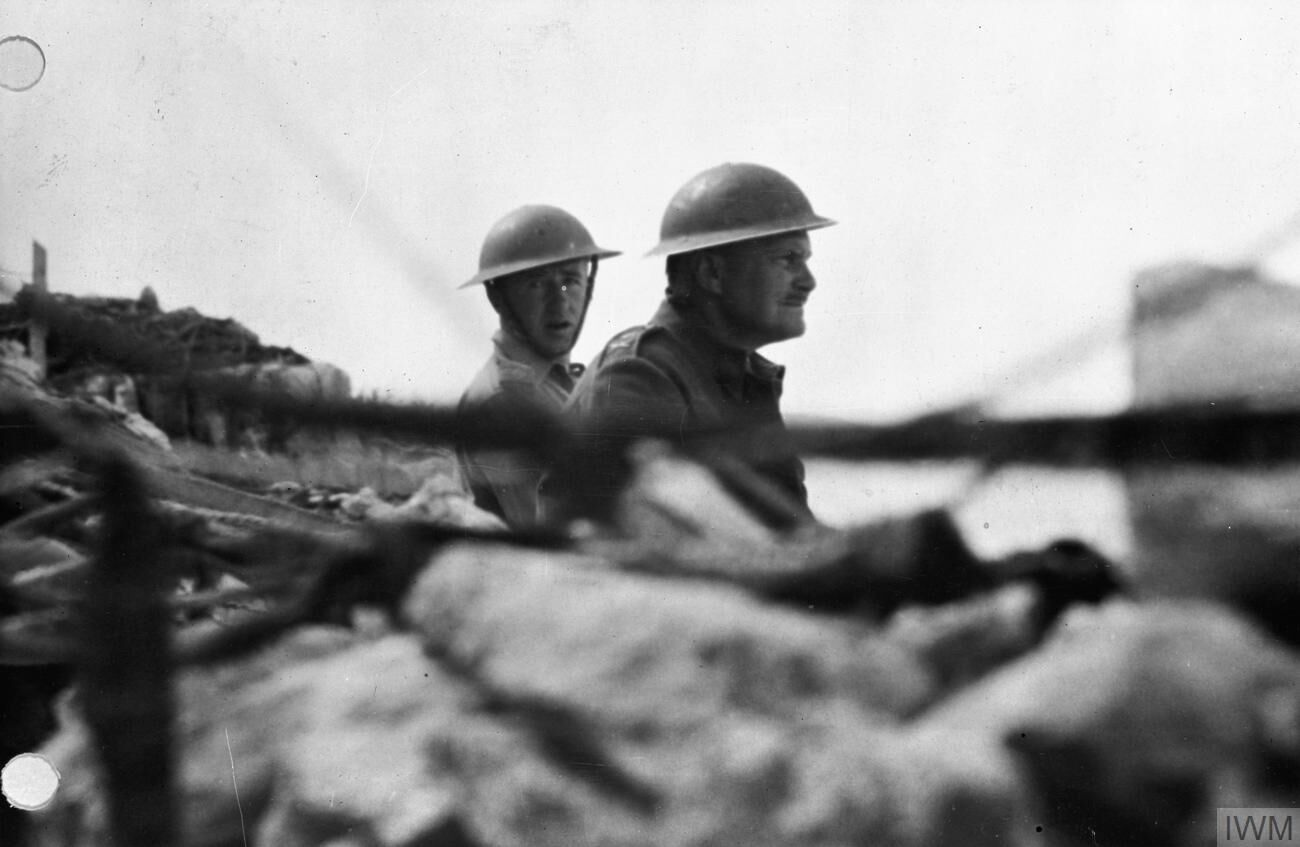
Freyberg (right) during the Battle of Crete, May 1941

The British Army classified Freyberg as unfit for active service in 1937. After the outbreak of war in September 1939, he returned to its active list in December as a specially employed major-general. On being approached by the New Zealand Government, Freyberg, by then commanding the Salisbury Plain Training Area in the United Kingdom, offered his services and was appointed commander of the 2nd New Zealand Expeditionary Force and of the 2nd New Zealand Division.

Under Freyberg's charter he was ultimately responsible only to the Government of New Zealand and as such was allowed to make decisions to protect the New Zealanders under his command. This enabled him at times to bypass his superior officers and confer directly with Peter Fraser, the Prime Minister of New Zealand, on certain issues. He was also insistent that his division would fight as a complete formation and not be split up into brigade groups or smaller. This brought him into conflict with his senior commanders in the war's early years, most notably with General Sir Archibald Wavell, then the Commander-in-Chief in the Middle East, where the division, which began to leave home in early 1940, began to concentrate.

In the chaos of the retreat from the Battle of Greece in 1941, Churchill gave Freyberg command of the Allied forces during the Battle of Crete. Although instructed to prevent an assault from the air, he remained obsessed with the possibility of a naval landing and based his tactics on it, neglecting adequately to defend the airfield at Maleme, ignoring ULTRA intelligence messages, which showed that the assault was coming by air. However, many sources consider that the intelligence given to Freyberg was vague and inadequate, and did indicate the possibility of a naval landing; this compromised his ability to respond correctly to the invasion.

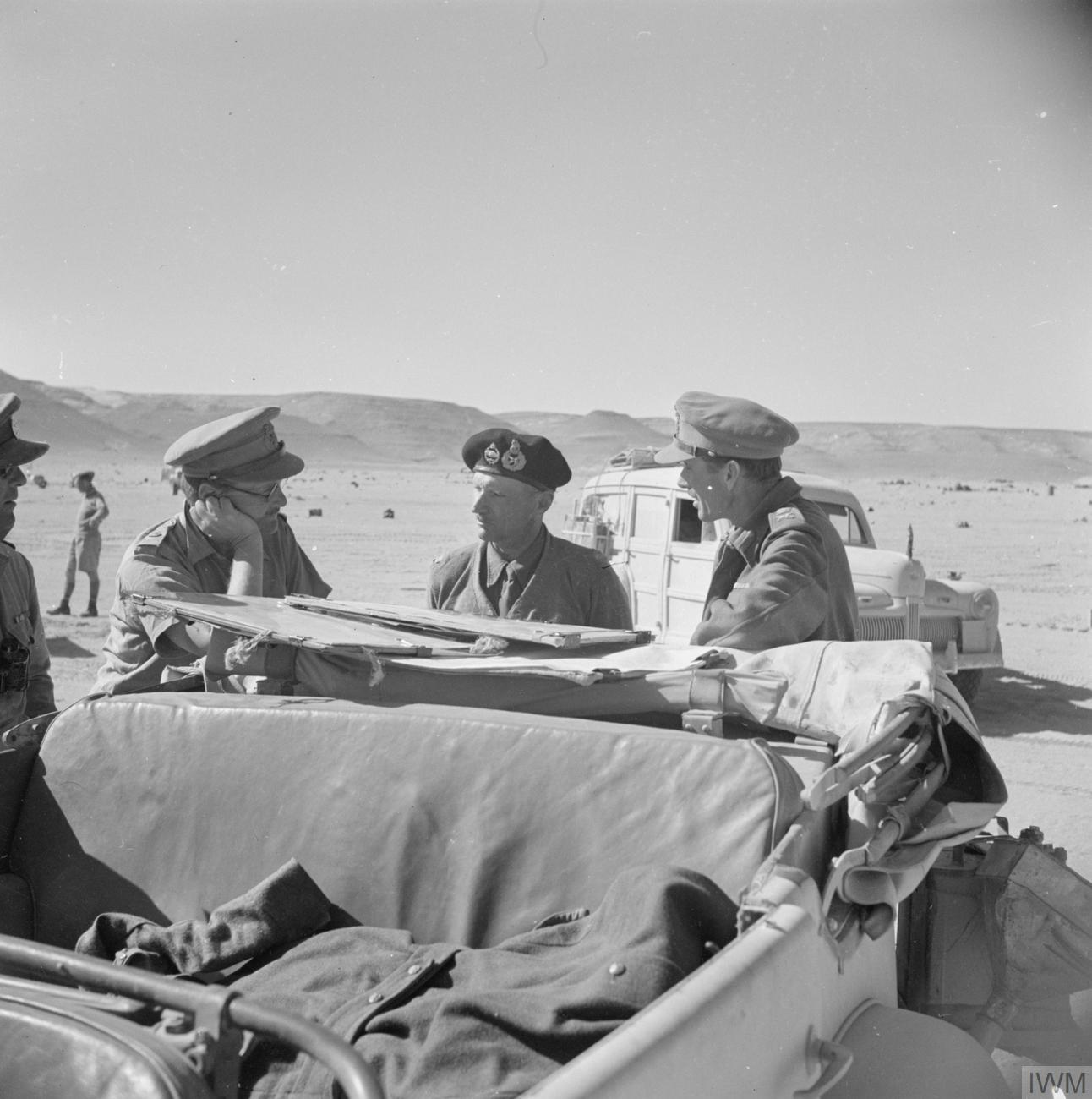
A conference between Lieutenant-General Bernard Montgomery, Lieutenant-General Freyberg and Lieutenant-General Herbert Lumsden, GOC X Corps, near Halfaya Pass before the army commander passed into Cyrenacia, 24 November 1942.

Promoted to lieutenant-general in March 1942, and knighted as a Knight Commander of the Order of the British Empire in the 1942 New Year Honours, Freyberg continued to command the 2nd New Zealand Division through the North African and Italian campaigns as part of the British Eighth Army. He had an excellent reputation as a divisional-level tactician. Winston Churchill, the British Prime Minister, described Freyberg as his "salamander" due to his love of fire and wanting to be always in the middle of the action. An exploding German shell wounded Freyberg at the Battle of Mersa Matruh in June 1942 but he soon returned to the battlefield. Freyberg disagreed strongly with his superior, General Claude Auchinleck, the Eighth Army commander and insisted that as a commander of a national contingent he had the right to refuse orders if those orders ran counter to the New Zealand national interest. Freyberg enjoyed a good relationship with General Bernard Montgomery, the Eighth Army commander from August 1942, who thought highly of the experienced New Zealand commander.

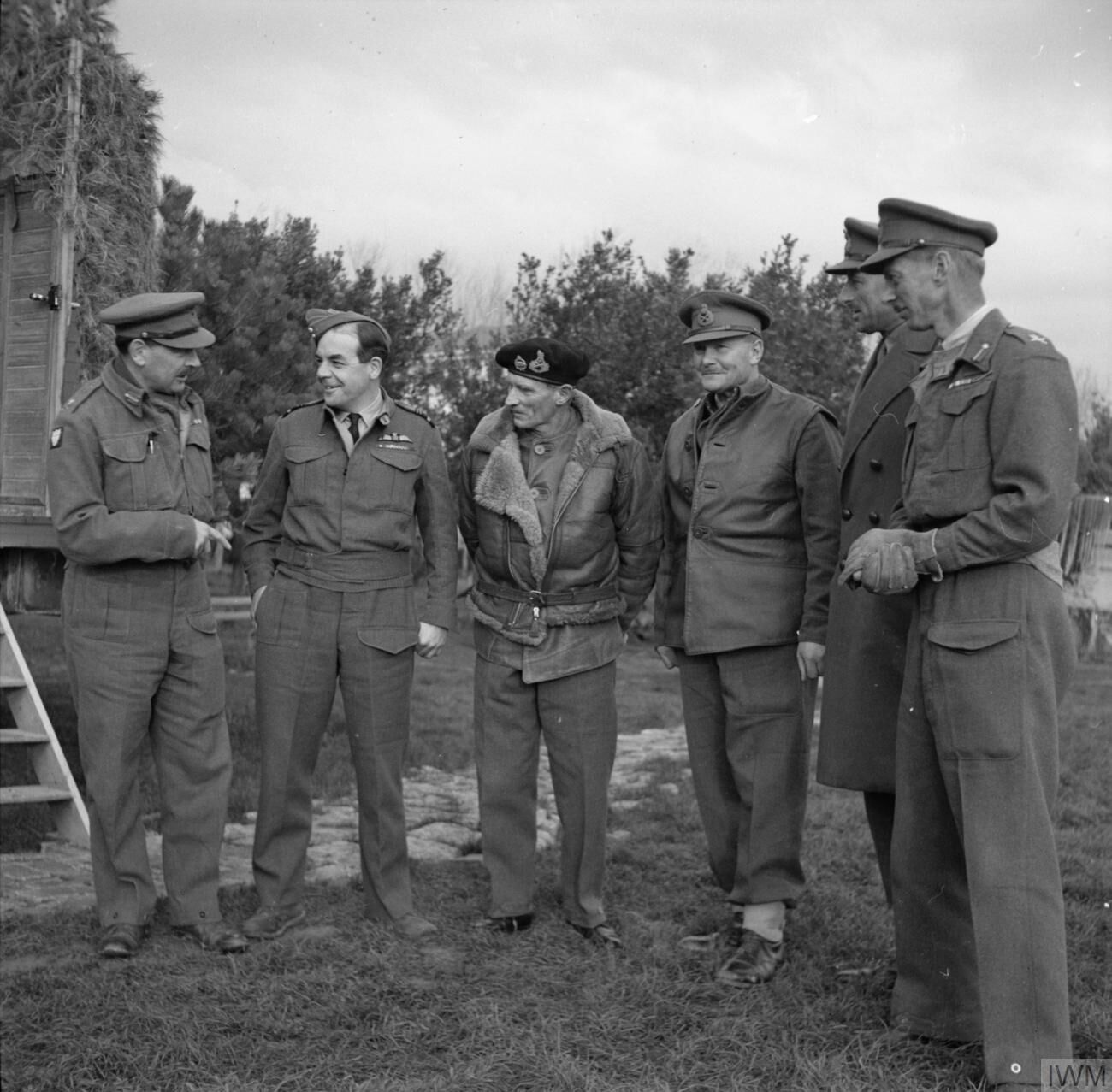
General Sir Bernard Montgomery with his senior officers at Eighth Army Headquarters at Vasto, Italy, 1943. From left to right, Freddie de Guingand, Harry Broadhurst, Montgomery, Sir Bernard Freyberg, Miles Dempsey and Charles Allfrey

In the climactic Second Battle of El Alamein (October–November 1942) the 2nd New Zealand Division played a vital part in the breakthrough by the Eighth Army; for his leadership, Freyberg was immediately promoted to Knight Commander of the Order of the Bath. During the pursuit of the Axis forces to Tunisia, where they surrendered in May 1943, he led the New Zealanders on a series of well-executed left hooks to outflank Axis defence lines. In April and May 1943 Freyberg briefly commanded X Corps.

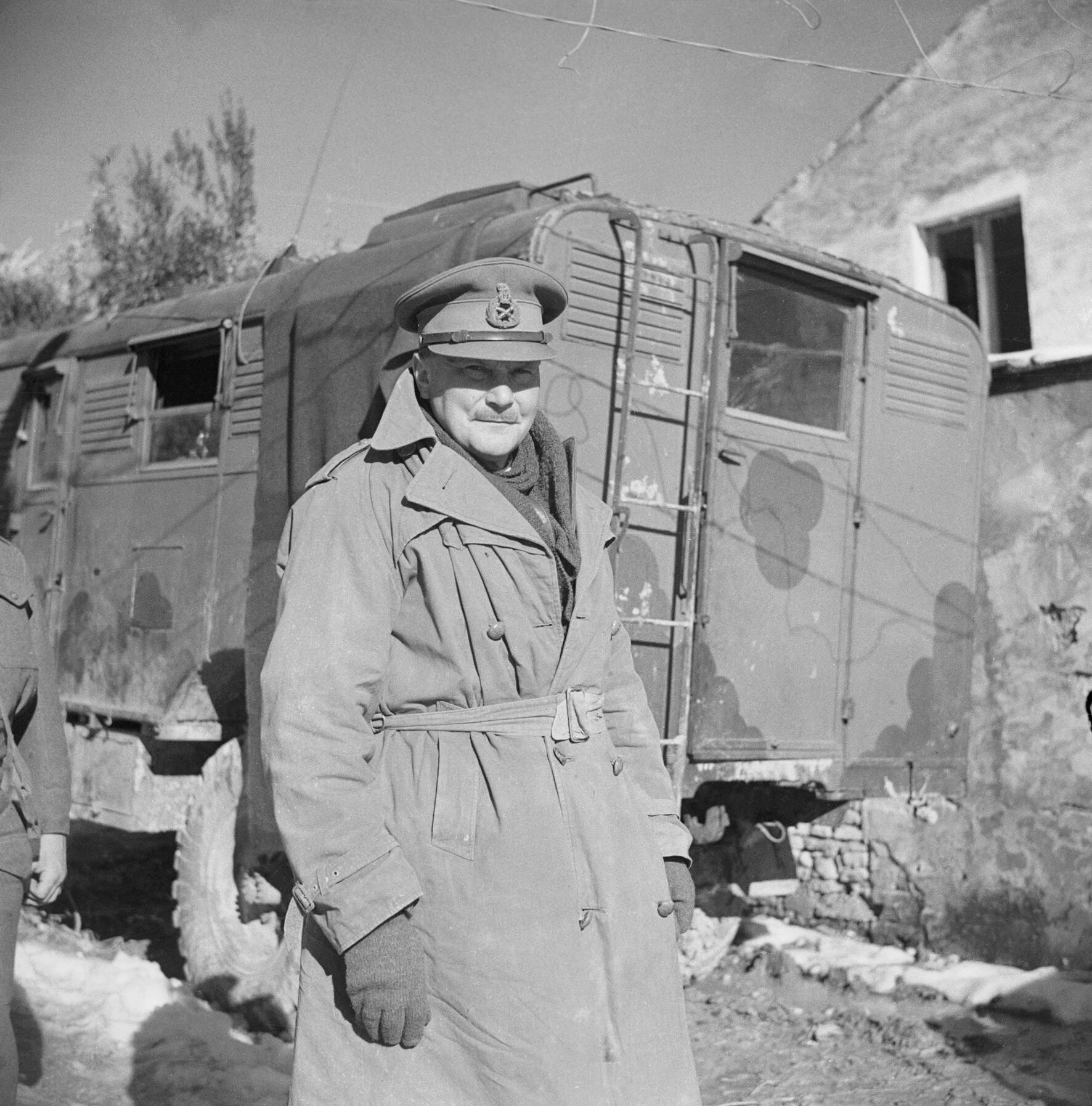
Freyberg at Cassino, Italy, 3 January 1944

Freyberg was injured in an aircraft accident in September 1944. After six weeks in hospital he returned to command the New Zealand Division in its final operations, the Spring 1945 offensive in Italy, which involved a series of river crossings and an advance of 250 mi (400 km) in three weeks. By the time of the German surrender, the New Zealanders had reached Trieste, having liberated both Padua and Venice, where there was a brief standoff with Yugoslav partisans. This success earned him a third bar to his DSO in July 1945 and he was made a Commander of the United States Legion of Merit.

Freyberg had excelled in planning set-piece attacks, such as at Operation Supercharge at Alamein, Operation Supercharge II at Tebaga Gap, and in the storming of the Senio line in 1945. The two occasions that Freyberg commanded at Corps level—at Crete and Monte Cassino—were less successful. Throughout the war he showed a disdain for danger. He showed notable concern for the welfare of his soldiers, taking a common-sense attitude to discipline and ensuring the establishment of social facilities for his men. He had become a very popular commander with the New Zealand troops, along with the people and government, by the time he left his command in 1945.

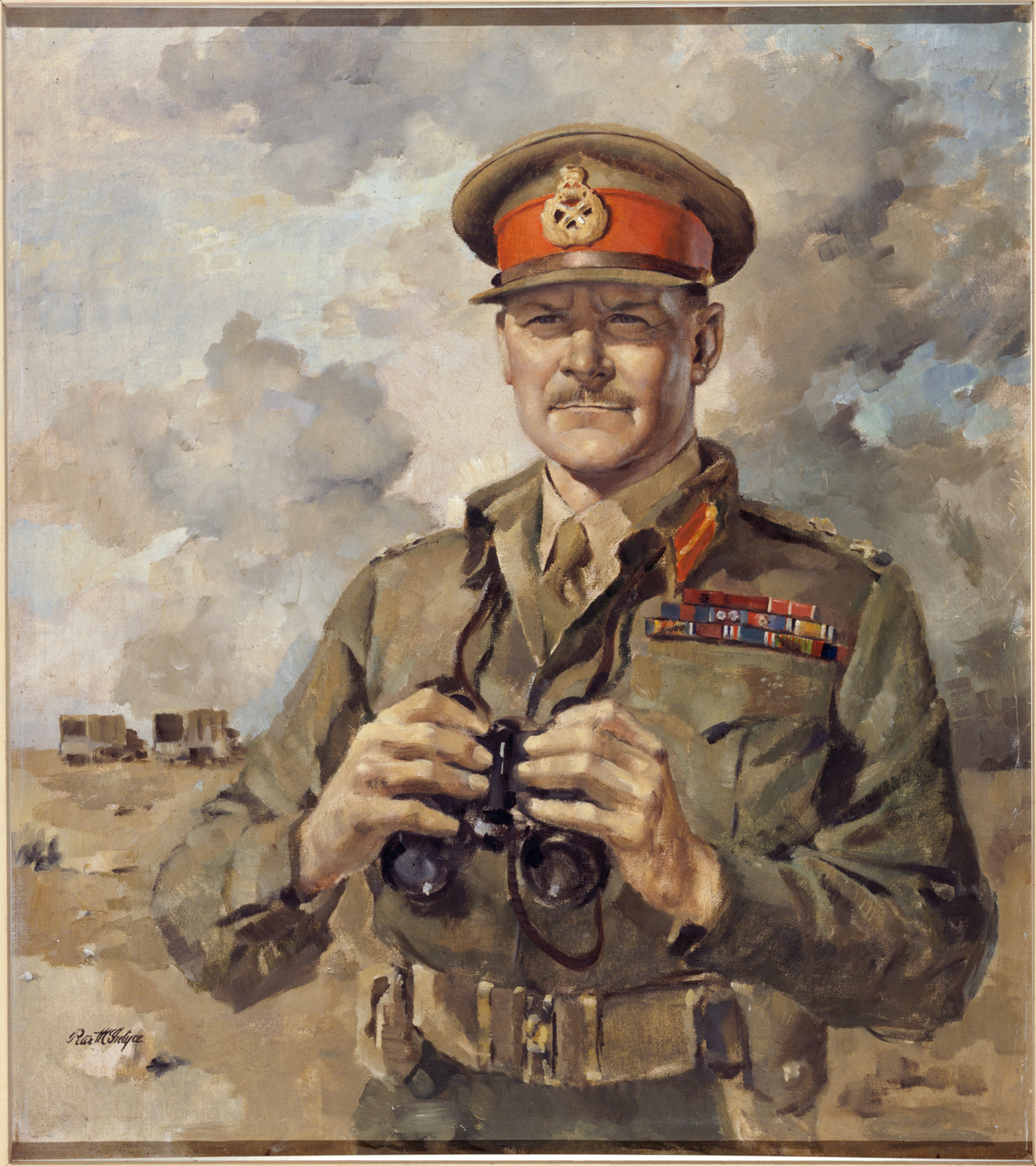
A portrait of Freyberg, executed by Peter McIntyre, an official war artist of the 2NZEF

Freyberg is closely associated with the controversial decision to bomb the ancient monastery at Monte Cassino in February 1944. Freyberg, commanding the troops which fought what later became known as the Second and Third Battles of Monte Cassino, became convinced the abbey, founded in 529 AD, was being used as a military stronghold. The analysis of one of Freyberg's divisional commanders, Major-General Francis Tuker of the 4th Indian Infantry Division, concluded in a memo to Freyberg that, regardless of whether the monastery was occupied by the Germans, it should be demolished to prevent its occupation. He pointed out that with 150 ft (46 m)-high walls made of masonry at least 10 ft (3.0 m) thick, it was impossible for engineers to break in and that bombing with "blockbuster" bombs would be the only solution since 1,000 lb (450 kg) bombs would be "next to useless". General Sir Harold Alexander, commander of the 15th Army Group (later the Allied Armies in Italy), agreed to the bombing (which did not employ blockbuster bombs). After the monastery's destruction, the ruins were occupied by German forces, which held the position until 18 May. Following the war, the abbot of the monastery and other monks said that German troops had not occupied the inside of the abbey and it was not being used for military purposes.

In Trieste in May 1945, the occupation by Yugoslav forces was challenged by the 2nd New Zealand Division under Freyberg, and the city remained part of Italy.

== Post-war ==
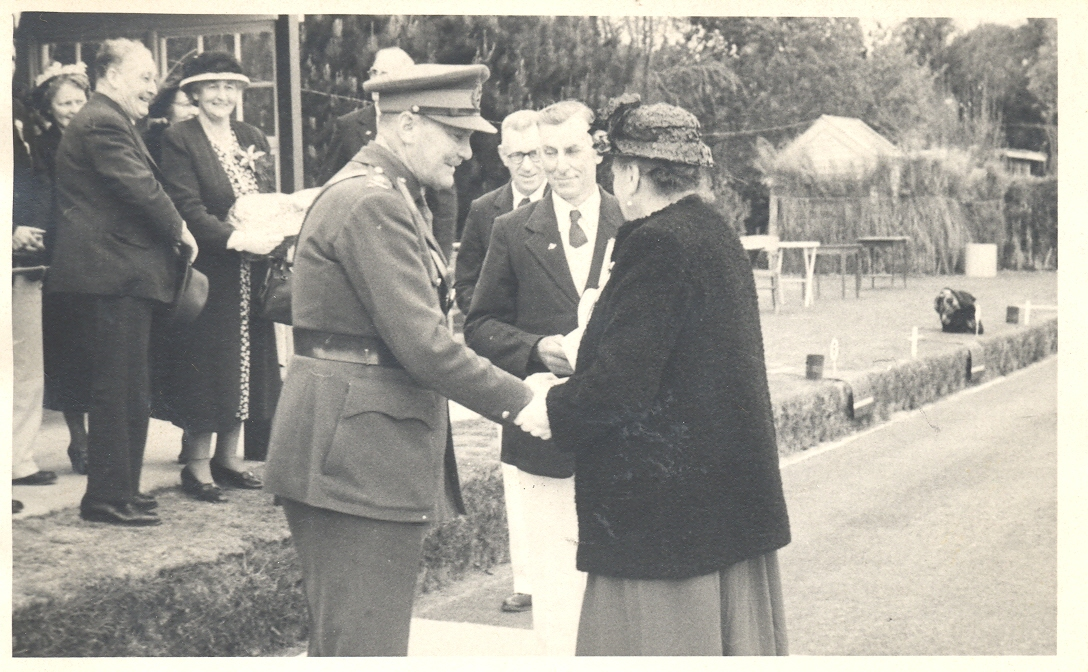
Governor-General Sir Bernard Freyberg in 1950

Freyberg relinquished command of the New Zealand division, on 22 November 1945 having accepted an invitation to become Governor-General of New Zealand. He left London for his new post on 3 May 1946, after being made a Knight Grand Cross of the Order of St Michael and St George. He retired from the army on 10 September 1946. On 1 January 1946 Freyberg was appointed a Knight of the Order of Saint John; his wife, Barbara, was made a Dame of the order at the same time.

Freyberg served as Governor-General of New Zealand from 1946 until 1952. In this post he played a very active role, visiting all parts of New Zealand and its dependencies. On 4 February 1950, he was given the honour of declaring the 1950 British Empire Games open at the opening ceremony.

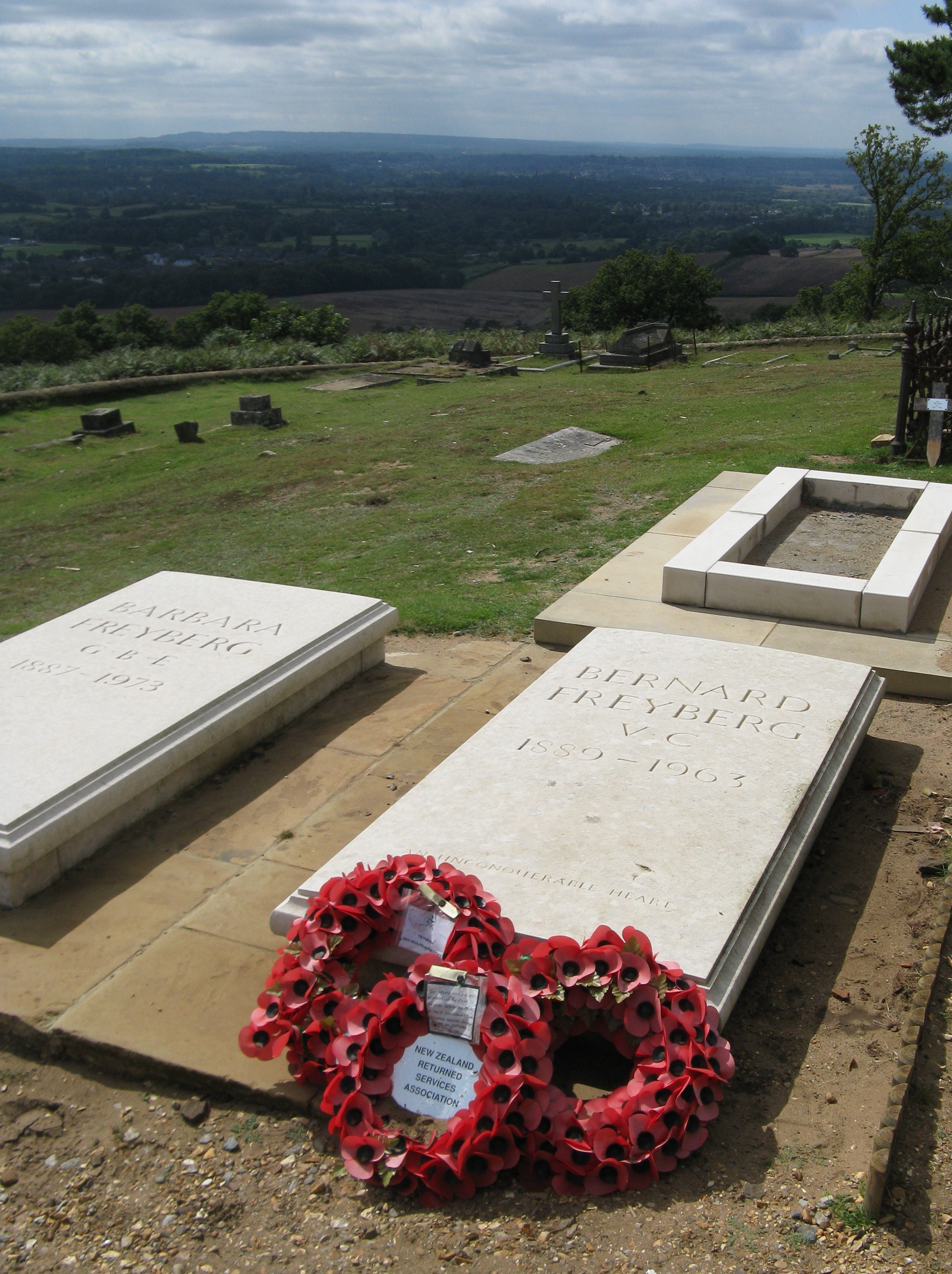
Freyberg's grave in the churchyard of St Martha on the Hill, near Guildford, Surrey

King George VI raised Freyberg to the peerage as Baron Freyberg, of Wellington in New Zealand and of Munstead in the County of Surrey, in 1951.

After his term as New Zealand governor-general had finished, Lord Freyberg returned to England, where he sat frequently in the House of Lords. On 1 March 1953 he became the Deputy Constable and Lieutenant-Governor of Windsor Castle; he took up residence in the Norman Gateway the following year.

Freyberg died at Windsor on 4 July 1963 following the rupture of one of his war wounds, and was buried in the churchyard of St Martha on the Hill near Guildford, Surrey. His wife is buried at his side, and their son, who had been awarded the MC, at the end of their graves.

== Tributes ==
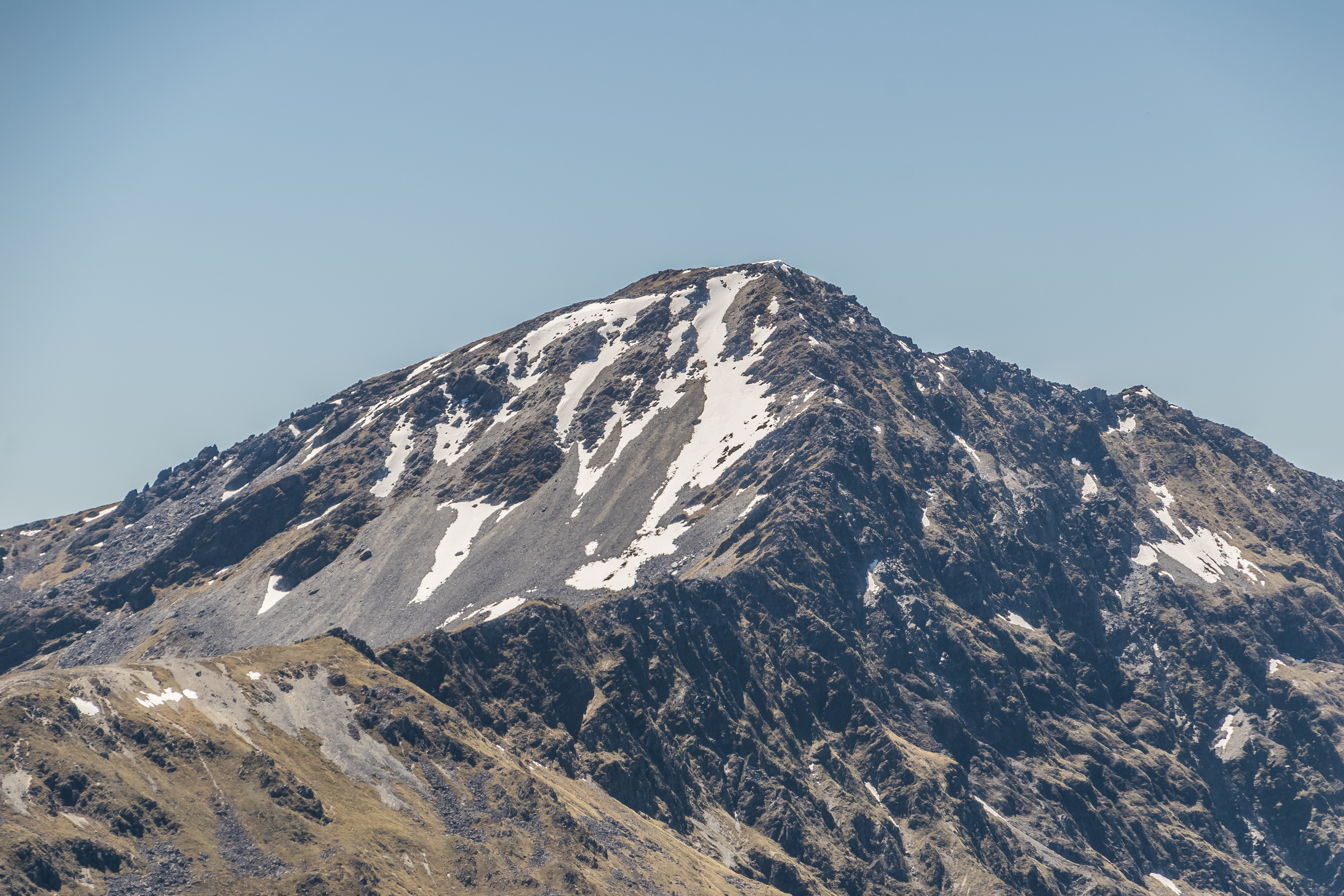
Mount Freyberg 1817 m

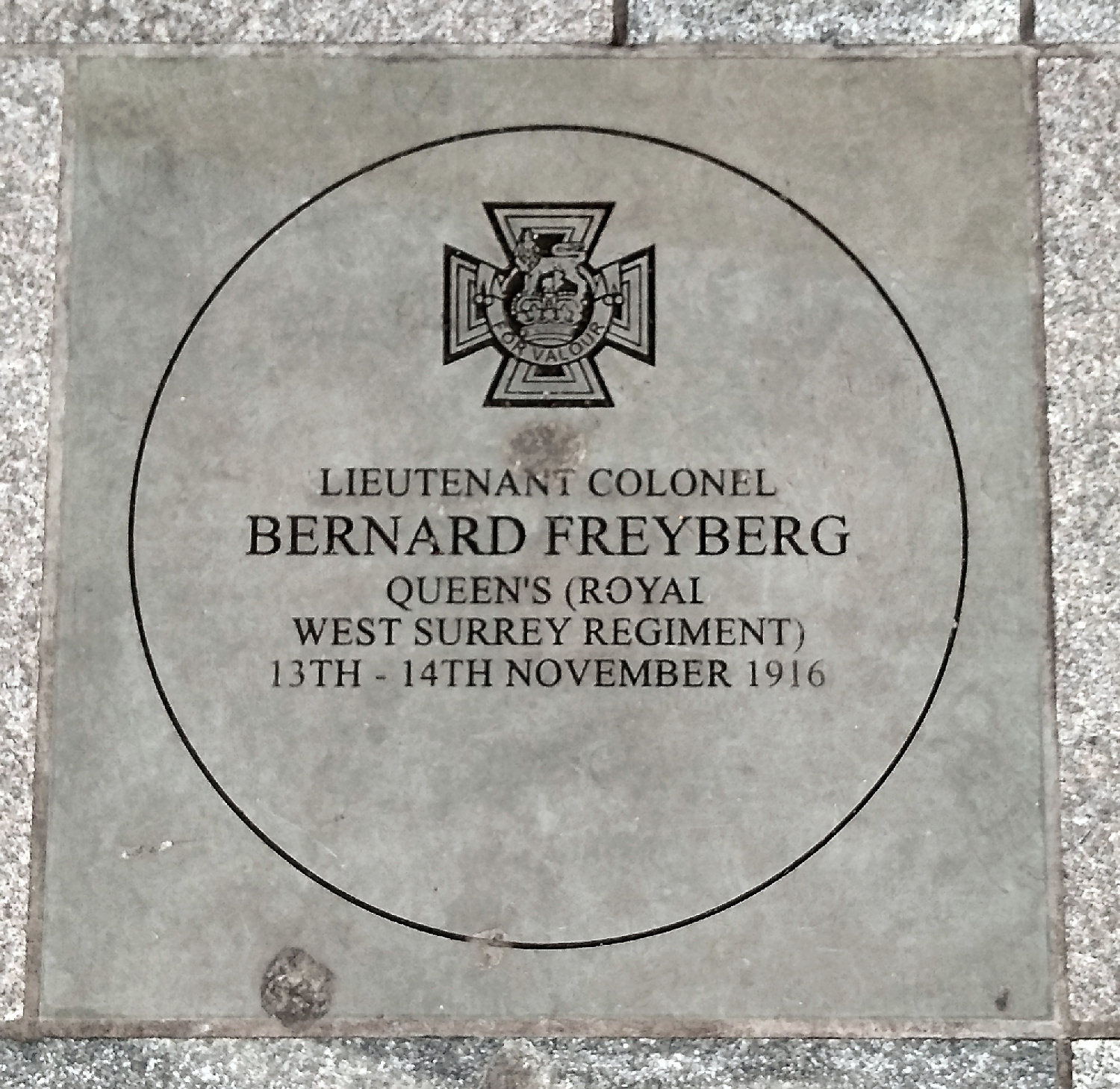
Monument commemorating Freyberg's Victoria Cross outside Richmond Station, London

An athlete as well as a soldier, he is memorialised in the name of the Ministry of Defence's headquarters, a stadium in Auckland and Wellington's swimming pool on the site of his early victories. A number of streets are named after him including Freyberg Place in front of the Metropolis tower in central Auckland where there is a statue of him.

Auckland's Freyberg Place (also known as Freyberg Square) was opened in 1946; Wellington's Freyberg Pool in Oriental Bay opened in 1963; and Auckland's Freyberg Field opened in 1965. The 15-storey Freyberg Building in Aitken Street, Thorndon, Wellington, was built in 1979. The adjacent Freyberg House built in about 2007 was demolished in 2018 after being damaged by the 2016 Kaikoura earthquake. Freyberg High School in Palmerston North opened in 1955.

The Sir Bernard Freyberg Cup is awarded to the winner in single sculls at the New Zealand Rowing Championship.

In November 2016 a blue plaque was unveiled at 8 Dynevor Road, Richmond, where he was born and a VC commemorative paving stone was unveiled to him outside Richmond Station by the Mayor of Richmond and the present Lord Freyberg.

== Styles ==
Note: An asterisk (*) denotes a Bar to the DSO.

- 1889–1914: Bernard Cyril Freyberg
- 1914 – 3 June 1915: Commander (temp.) Bernard Cyril Freyberg, RNVR
- 3 June 1915 – May 1916: Commander (temp.) Bernard Cyril Freyberg, DSO, RNVR
- May–June 1916: Captain Bernard Cyril Freyberg, DSO
- June–July 1916: Captain (Temp. Major) Bernard Cyril Freyberg, DSO
- July – 12 December 1916: Captain (Temp. Lieutenant-Colonel) Bernard Cyril Freyberg, DSO
- 12 December 1916 – 1917: Captain (Temp. Lieutenant-Colonel) Bernard Cyril Freyberg, VC, DSO
- 1917 – 1 February 1919: Captain (Temp. Brigadier-General) Bernard Cyril Freyberg, VC, DSO
- 1 February – 7 March 1919: Captain (Brevet Lieutenant-Colonel; Temp. Brigadier) Bernard Cyril Freyberg, VC, DSO*
- 7 March – June 1919: Captain (Brevet Lieutenant-Colonel) Bernard Cyril Freyberg, VC, DSO*
- June 1919 – 1920: Captain (Brevet Lieutenant-Colonel) Bernard Cyril Freyberg, VC, DSO**
- 1920–1927: Captain (Brevet Lieutenant-Colonel) Bernard Cyril Freyberg, VC, CMG, DSO**
- 1927–1929: Major (Brevet Lieutenant-Colonel) Bernard Cyril Freyberg, VC, CMG, DSO**
- 1929–1931: Lieutenant-Colonel Bernard Cyril Freyberg, VC, CMG, DSO**
- 1931–1934: Colonel Bernard Cyril Freyberg, VC, CMG, DSO**
- 1934–1935: Major-General Bernard Cyril Freyberg, VC, CMG, DSO**
- 1935–1941: Major-General Bernard Cyril Freyberg, VC, CB, CMG, DSO**
- 1941–1942: Lieutenant-General Sir Bernard Cyril Freyberg, VC, KBE, CB, CMG, DSO**
- 1942–1945: Lieutenant-General Sir Bernard Cyril Freyberg, VC, KCB, KBE, CMG, DSO**
- 1945–1946: Lieutenant-General Sir Bernard Cyril Freyberg, VC, KCB, KBE, CMG, DSO***
- 1946–1951: Lieutenant-General His Excellency Sir Bernard Cyril Freyberg, VC, GCMG, KCB, KBE, DSO***
- 1951–1952: Lieutenant-General His Excellency The Right Honourable The Lord Freyberg, VC, GCMG, KCB, KBE, DSO***
- 1952–1963: Lieutenant-General The Right Honourable The Lord Freyberg, VC, GCMG, KCB, KBE, DSO***

== Arms ==
Coat of arms of Bernard Freyberg, 1st Baron Freyberg
Notes The arms of Bernard Freyberg consist of: (Carved depiction) Adopted 19 Oct 1951 Crest A Demi Lion Gules holding between the paws an Eagle displayed Sable Escutcheon Or on a Chief Sable four Mullets of the field Supporters On either side a Salamander proper Motto New Zeal and Honour Other elements Mantling Symbolism The motto is a play on "New Zealand Honour"

== Honours and awards ==
- Barony as Freyberg (UK, 1951)
- Knight Grand Cross of the Order of St Michael and St George (UK, 1946)
- Knight Commander of the Most Honourable Order of the Bath (UK, 1940) CB – 3 June 1919
- Knight Commander of the Order of the British Empire (UK, 1 January 1934)
- Companion of the Distinguished Service Order and Three Bars (UK, 1916, 1917, 1918, 1918)
- Victoria Cross (UK, 1917)
- Mentioned in Despatches (UK, 6 times)
- Knight of the Venerable Order of St. John
- New Zealand War Service Medal
- Croix de Guerre (France)
- War Cross (Greece) 1st class
- Cross of Valour (Greece)
- Grand Commander with Swords of the Order of George I (Greece)
- Legion of Merit (US)

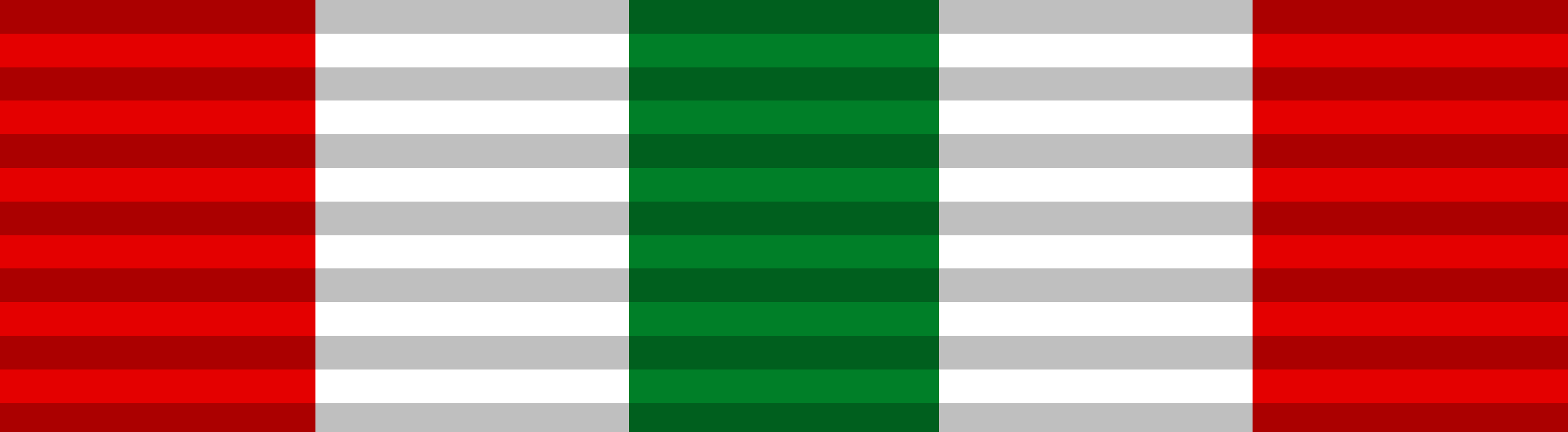

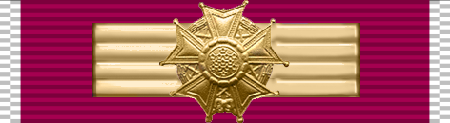

== Notes ==
Military offices
New post	GOC 2nd New Zealand Division; 1939–1945	Division disbanded
Preceded by Brian Horrocks	GOC X Corps; April–May 1943	Succeeded by Richard McCreery
Government offices
Preceded by Sir Cyril Newall	Governor-General of New Zealand; 1946–1952	Succeeded by Sir Willoughby Norrie
Peerage of the United Kingdom
New creation	Baron Freyberg; 1951–1963	Succeeded by Paul Freyberg
