= Advisory Panel of Works of Art =

Advisory panel of the UK House of Lords

The Lord Speaker's Advisory Panel of Works of Art, formerly the Works of Art Committee, is an advisory panel of the House of Lords whose members are appointed by the Lord Speaker "to advise ... on matters relating to works of art in the House of Lords". The Works of Art Committee was reconfigured into the Advisory Panel after the a review of the House of Lords' governance in 2016.

== Chairs ==
Committee chairs include those listed below.

Name	Start	End	Party
The Lord Luke	9 June 2010	14 May 2014	Conservative
The Baroness Maddock (Note: Maddock was the chair of the Works of Art Committee from 12 June 2014 to 31 August 2016 and chair of the Lord Speaker's Advisory Panel on Works of Art from 25 January 2017 to 26 June 2020.)	12 June 2014	26 June 2020	Liberal Democrats
The Lord Roberts of Belgravia	13 May 2026	present	Conservative

== Membership ==
As of May 2026, the members of the panel are as follows:

- The Lord Roberts of Belgravia (chair)
- The Lord Berkeley of Knighton
- The Lord Blencathra
- The Baroness Bonham-Carter of Yarnbury
- The Baroness Bull
- The Baroness Maclean of Redditch
- The Baroness McIntosh of Hudnall
- The Lord Parkinson of Whitley Bay
- The Baroness Pitkeathley
- The Baroness Rafferty
- The Lord Razzall
- The Baroness Sater
- The Lord True

== See also ==
- Parliamentary committees of the United Kingdom
