= Baron Freyberg =

Barony in the Peerage of the United Kingdom

Barony of Freyberg
- Or a chief sable four mullets of the field
- Creation date: 19 October 1951
- Created by: King George VI
- Peerage: Peerage of the United Kingdom
- First holder: Sir Bernard Freyberg
- Present holder: Valerian Freyberg, 3rd Baron Freyberg
- Heir apparent: Hon. Joseph Freyberg
- Remainder to: Heirs male of the first baron's body lawfully begotten
- Motto: "New zeal and honour"

Baron Freyberg, of Wellington in New Zealand and of Munstead in the County of Surrey, is a title in the Peerage of the United Kingdom. It was created in 1951 for the prominent military commander Lieutenant-General Sir Bernard Freyberg. He served as Governor-General of New Zealand from 1946 to 1952. His only son, the second Baron, was a Colonel in the Grenadier Guards.

As of 2017, the title is held by the latter's only son, the third Baron, who succeeded in 1993. Lord Freyberg is one of the ninety hereditary peers elected to remain in the House of Lords after the passing of the House of Lords Act 1999, and sits as a cross-bencher.

The family seat is Munstead House, near Godalming, Surrey.

== Barons Freyberg (1951) ==
- Bernard Cyril Freyberg, 1st Baron Freyberg (1889–1963)
- Paul Richard Freyberg, 2nd Baron Freyberg (1923–1993)
- Valerian Bernard Freyberg, 3rd Baron Freyberg (b. 1970)

The heir apparent and sole heir to the peerage is the present holder's son, the Hon. Joseph John Freyberg (b. 2007)
