= Aric Almirola =

American racing driver (born 1984)

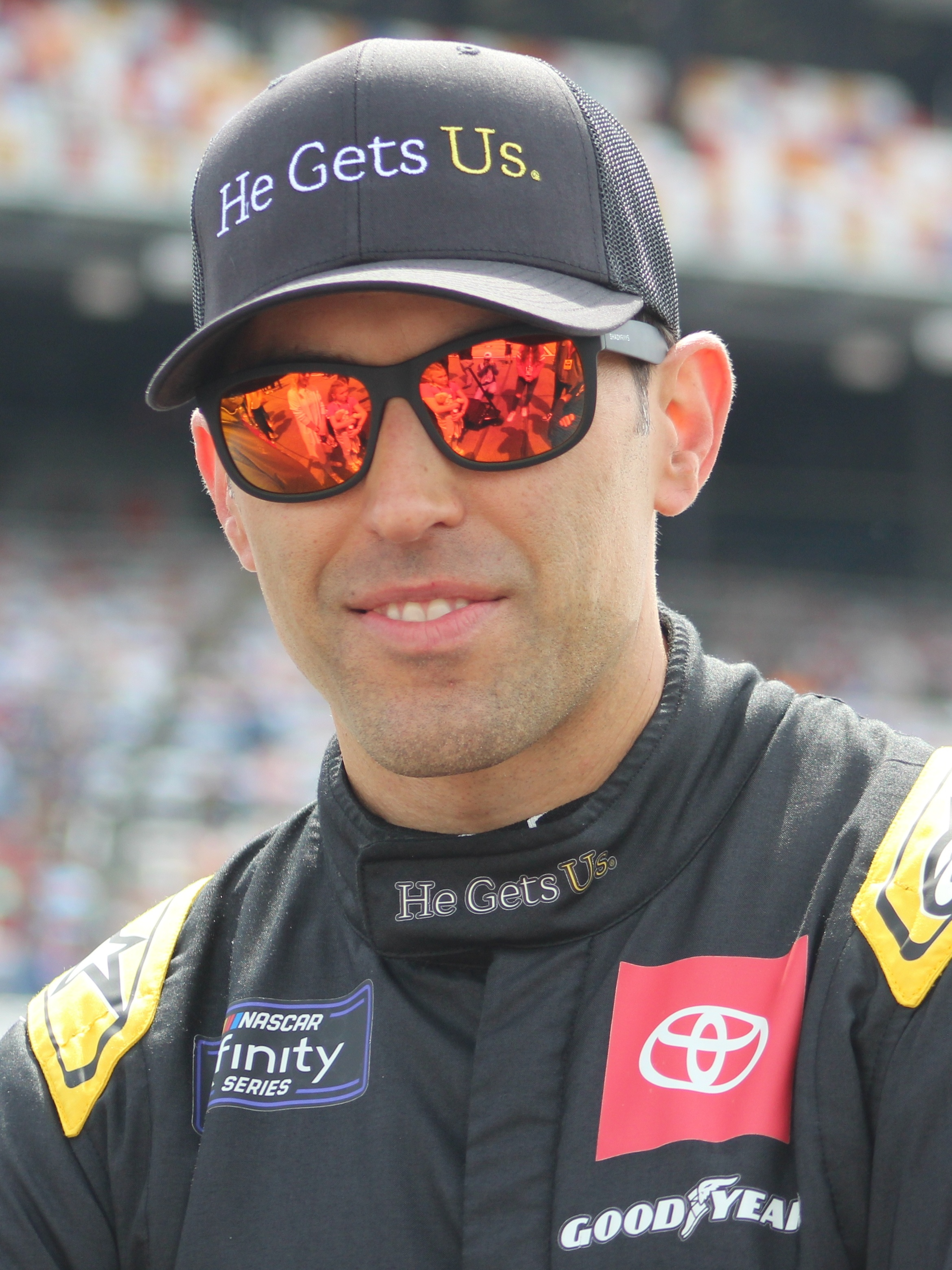
- Almirola at Richmond Raceway in 2024
- Born: Aric Michael Almirola; March 14, 1984 (age 42); Fort Walton Beach, Florida, U.S.
- Height: 6 ft 0 in (1.83 m)
- Weight: 160 lb (73 kg)
- Achievements: 2014 Coke Zero 400 Winner; 2018 1000Bulbs.com 500 Winner; 2021, 2023 Bluegreen Vacations Duel Winner; 2021 NASCAR All-Star Open Winner

NASCAR Cup Series career
- 460 races run over 16 years
- Best finish: 5th (2018)
- First race: 2007 UAW-DaimlerChrysler 400 (Las Vegas)
- Last race: 2023 NASCAR Cup Series Championship Race (Phoenix)
- First win: 2014 Coke Zero 400 (Daytona)
- Last win: 2021 Foxwoods Resort Casino 301 (New Hampshire)
Wins	Top tens	Poles
3	96	6

NASCAR O'Reilly Auto Parts Series career
- 135 races run over 14 years
- 2025 position: 17th
- Best finish: 4th (2011)
- First race: 2006 Circuit City 250 (Richmond)
- Last race: 2025 NASCAR Xfinity Series Championship Race (Phoenix)
- First win: 2007 AT&T 250 (Milwaukee)
- Last win: 2025 Focused Health 302 (Las Vegas)
Wins	Top tens	Poles
10	59	5

NASCAR FedEx Freight Truck Series career
- 78 races run over 8 years
- Best finish: 2nd (2010)
- First race: 2005 O'Reilly 200 (Memphis)
- Last race: 2012 WinStar World Casino 350K (Texas)
- First win: 2010 Dover 200 (Dover)
- Last win: 2010 VFW 200 (Michigan)
Wins	Top tens	Poles
2	38	0

ARCA Menards Series career
- 2 races run over 2 years
- Best finish: 143rd (2008)
- First race: 2005 Food World 300 (Talladega)
- Last race: 2008 Pennsylvania ARCA 200 (Pocono)
Wins	Top tens	Poles
0	0	0

ARCA Menards Series East career
- 1 race run over 1 year
- Best finish: 49th (2008)
- First race: 2008 Sunoco 150 (Dover)
- First win: 2008 Sunoco 150 (Dover)
Wins	Top tens	Poles
1	1	0

ARCA Menards Series West career
- 1 race run over 1 year
- Best finish: 30th (2018)
- First race: 2018 Carneros 200 (Sonoma)
Wins	Top tens	Poles
0	1	0
- Statistics up to date as of November 1, 2025.

Aric Michael Almirola (born March 14, 1984) is an American semi-retired professional stock car racing driver. He last competed part-time in the NASCAR Xfinity Series, driving the No. 19 Toyota GR Supra for Joe Gibbs Racing. He has previously competed full-time in the NASCAR Cup Series, part-time in the NASCAR Craftsman Truck Series, as well as what is now the ARCA Menards Series, ARCA Menards Series East, and ARCA Menards Series West.

== Racing career ==
=== Early career ===
Almirola was born on Eglin Air Force Base in Fort Walton Beach, Florida, of Cuban descent. He began racing go-karts when he was eight years old. At the age of fourteen, he began racing nationally. He won the pole position in his debut in the World Karting Association race and finished fourth in the standings that year. Two years later, he moved up into modifieds and won several Rookie of the Year awards.

=== NASCAR ===
In 2002, Almirola moved to the NASCAR Sun Belt Weekly Racing Division and finished second in the Rookie of the Year standings. He followed that up with five pole positions in 2003. In 2004, he became one of the first drivers to participate in NASCAR's Drive for Diversity program. He also signed with Joe Gibbs Racing as a development driver under a partnership with former NFL player Reggie White. Almirola ran the season at Ace Speedway and won two races before finishing eleventh in the points standings. He won five more races at the track in 2005, made his Truck Series debut with Morgan-Dollar Motorsports, and had two top-tens in four races.

==== 2006–2007 ====
For 2006, Almirola drove the No. 75 Spears Manufacturing-sponsored Chevy for Spears Motorsports in the Craftsman Truck Series, as part of the JGR development program. He started every race and had three top-ten finishes, including a best finish of ninth, ending the season eighteenth. That season, he also drove nine races in the Busch Series for Gibbs in the No. 19 Husqvarna/Banquet Foods-sponsored Chevrolet Monte Carlo. His best finish was eleventh at Dover International Speedway. He also served as a test driver for Gibbs' teammates J. J. Yeley and Denny Hamlin when their Nextel Cup and Busch Series schedules conflicted. He also scored his first career pole at the Milwaukee Mile, qualifying the No. 20 car for Denny Hamlin, who competed in the race.

Almirola moved up to the Busch series regularly in 2007, driving the No. 18 and No. 20 Chevys for Joe Gibbs, driving each car in ten races apiece. He won his second career pole award for the Orbitz 300 at Daytona. He won the pole again, for the second straight year, at the AT&T 250 at the Milwaukee Mile, but thought he was going to give up driving duties to Hamlin again; Hamlin's helicopter was unable to land in time for Hamlin to make it to the track, so Almirola started the race, leading the first 43 laps of the race. On lap 59, during a caution period, because of sponsor commitments, Hamlin took over for Almirola while he was running in the third place. Hamlin went on to win the race, but Almirola was credited with his first NASCAR Busch Series win because he was the driver who started the race. Almirola did not participate in team victory celebrations after the race as he had already left the track. He soon asked for his release and later joined Dale Earnhardt, Inc. following the sale of Ginn Racing. He drove the No. 01 Chevrolet in five races in 2007 and had a best finish of 30th.

==== 2008–2009 ====
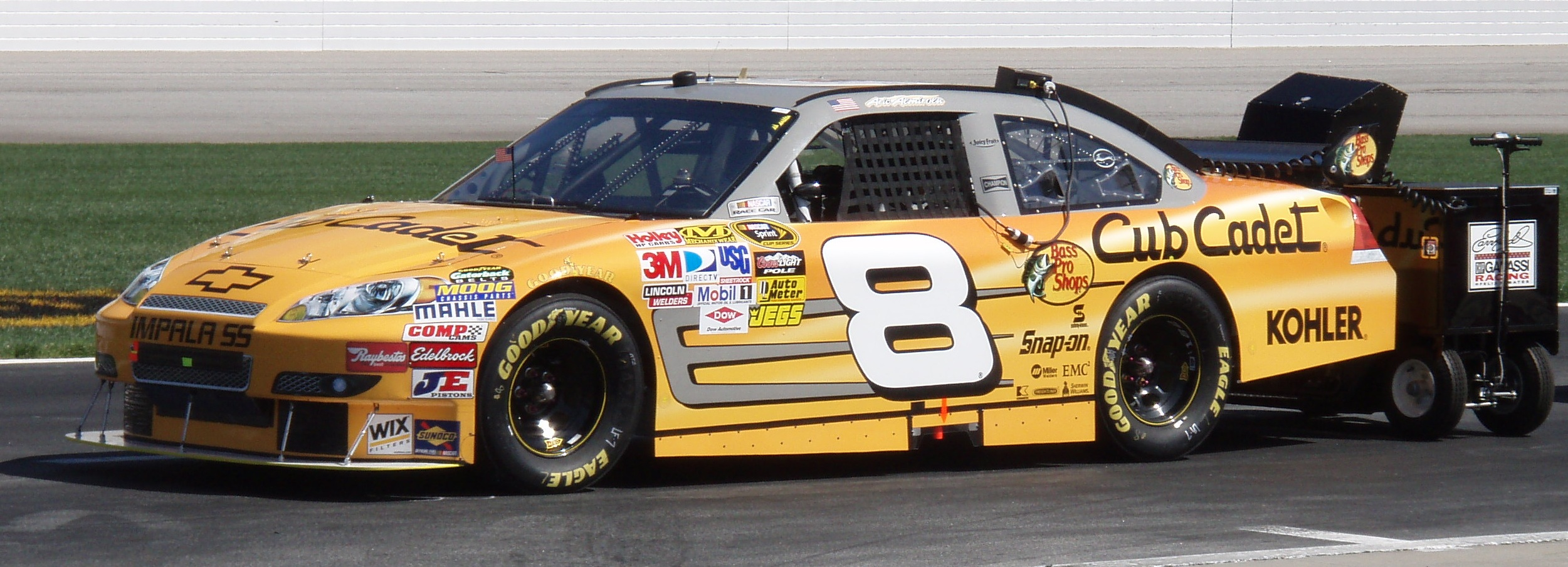
Almirola's No. 8 Cup car in 2009

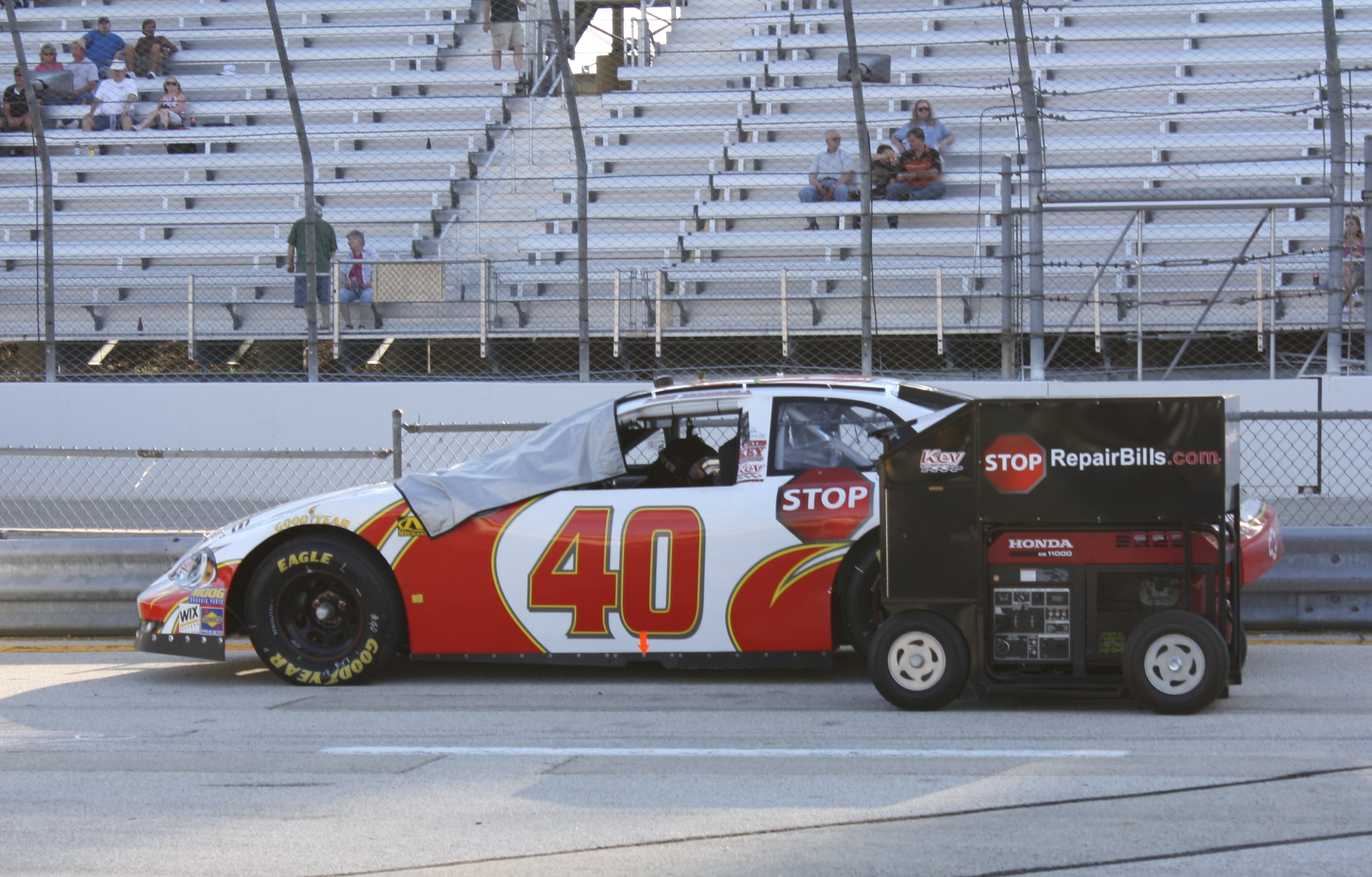
Almirola's No. 40 Nationwide car in 2009

Almirola was named co-driver of the No. 8 United States Army-sponsored Chevrolet for the 2008 Sprint Cup Series, sharing the ride with Mark Martin. His best finish during the season was an eighth-place finish in the 2008 Food City 500 at Bristol, and his best start in Sprint Cup was a third-place start at the 2008 Goody's Cool Orange 500 at Martinsville. Almirola was named the full-time driver of the No. 8 for the 2009 season. Seven races into the 2009 season, Almirola lost his ride due to lack of sponsorship. He later signed a five-race deal with Key Motorsports to drive their No. 40 Chevrolet Impala SS in the Nationwide Series. He returned to the Truck Series, driving part-time in the No. 15 Graceway Pharmaceuticals-sponsored Toyota Tundra for Billy Ballew Motorsports, and had a seven-race streak of finishing eighth or better. He also made one attempt and one race in the No. 09 Phoenix Racing Chevrolet in the Sprint Cup Series. In October 2009, he filed paperwork in the North Carolina Superior Court indicating that he had a breach-of-contract dispute with Earnhardt Ganassi Racing and Dale Earnhardt Inc. Almirola competed in seven Sprint Cup races in 2009 for the team before his No. 8 Chevy car was parked because of a lack of sponsorship. The lawsuit was dropped a month later after being settled out of court.

==== 2010–2012: Resurgence in Truck and Nationwide ====
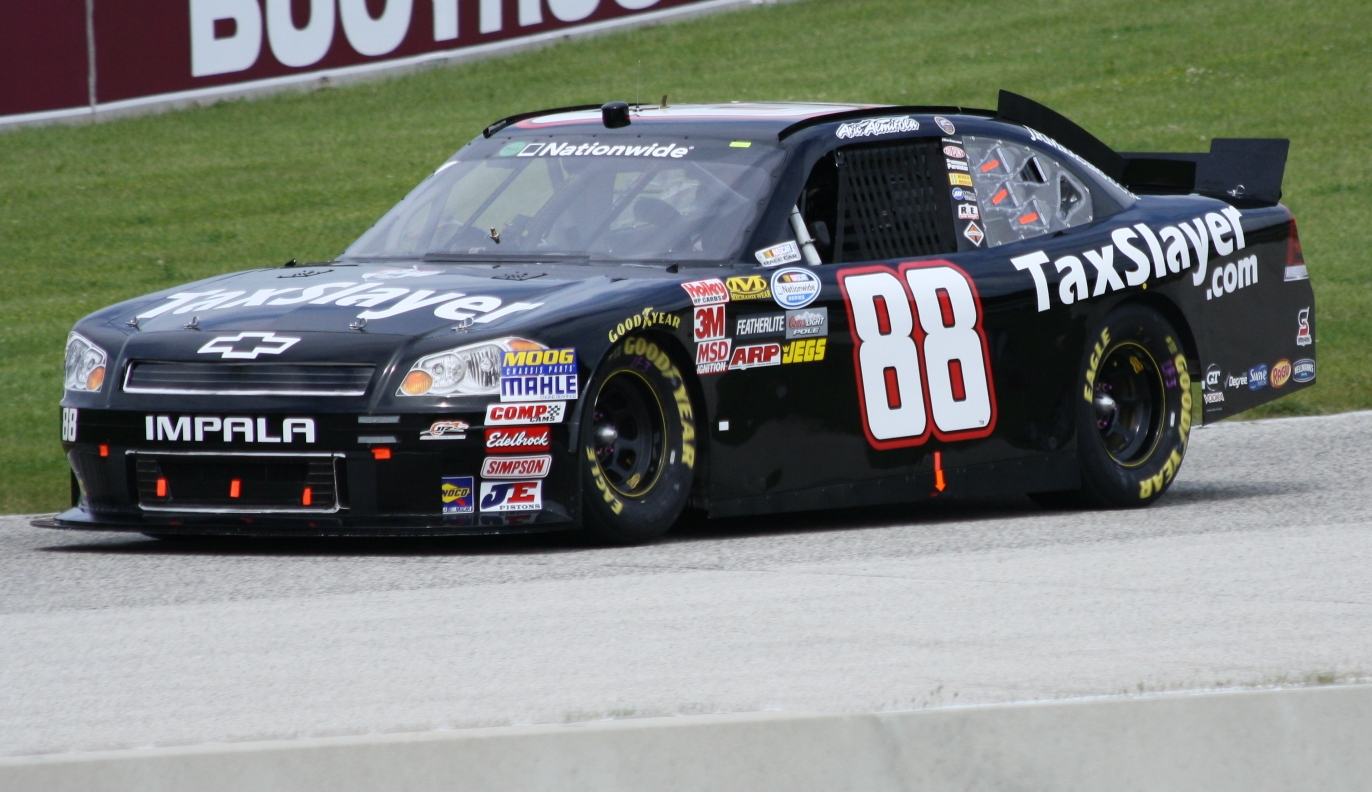
Almirola's No. 88 Nationwide car in 2011

For 2010, Almirola was to drive full-time for Phoenix Racing's No. 09 Cup series Chevrolet Impala. He also drove the No. 51 Graceway Pharmaceuticals/AK Awareness-sponsored Toyota Tundra for Billy Ballew in the Camping World Truck Series. In April, Almirola parted ways with Phoenix Racing to focus on his Truck Series ride. Almirola attempted the Aarons 499 at Talladega in No. 35 Tommy Baldwin Racing/Mohawk-sponsored Chevrolet but failed to qualify after qualifying was rained out by NASCAR. Almirola won his first race in the Camping World Truck Series at Dover International Speedway and won again at Michigan International Speedway, holding off Todd Bodine and Kyle Busch. Almirola would finish second in points to Bodine.

Hendrick Motorsports named Almirola as a standby driver for the No. 48 team in case Jimmie Johnson needed to leave for the birth of his daughter. Almirola was not needed. In July 2010, Almirola was again a standby driver for Hendrick Motorsports at Pocono in case Jeff Gordon had to leave or miss the race due to the birth of Gordon's son. At Loudon, he was on standby for a sick Scott Speed. He drove the No. 9 Richard Petty Motorsports Ford at Martinsville Speedway in Fall 2010 after Kasey Kahne was released from his contract. Almirola had his first Sprint Cup top-five finish at Homestead. At Talladega in the fall, he ended up in the closest finish in Truck Series history by ending up second to Kyle Busch in 0.002 of a second, who passed underneath Almirola below the yellow line. The 1-2 finish was the same as the previous race in 2009 but the finish was controversial because of the yellow line rules (as NASCAR rules state that a driver must not advance his position by going below the yellow line even if he is forced down there). However, officials determined that Busch had the lead before going below the yellow line, which made Busch's winning move legal. In 2011, Almirola drove the No. 88 Nationwide Series car for JR Motorsports. He won two poles and had eighteen top-tens to finish fourth in points. He was released from his contract after the season when he accepted a full-time Sprint Cup ride, driving for Richard Petty Motorsports in the No. 43 Ford.

==== 2012–2017: Return to Cup in the No. 43 ====
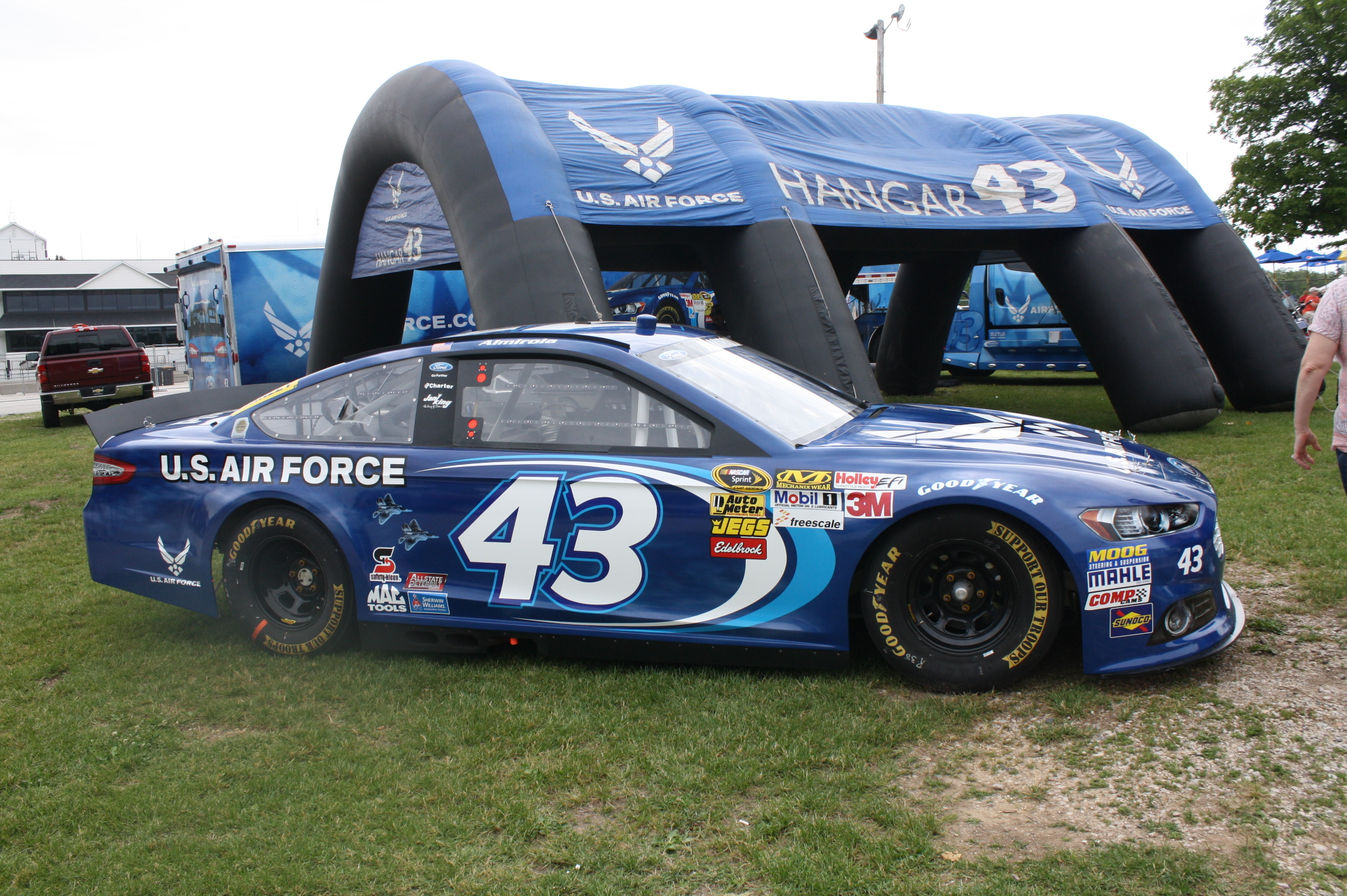
Almirola's 2013 Sprint Cup car, in the same Air Force scheme he took to victory lane at Daytona in 2014

After only running one year's worth of Sprint Cup Series races in his career, Richard Petty Motorsports signed Almirola to a one-year contract, replacing the departing A. J. Allmendinger in the legendary 43 car. Almirola earned the pole at Charlotte in May, and collected one top-five and four top-tens en route to a 20th-place finish in points. Aric's best run of the year may have been at Kansas in October, where he qualified fifth and led 69 laps after taking the top spot on lap 6. But on lap 121, Almirola blew a tire, sending his Farmland Ford into the wall. He spun on lap 172, racing for the lead, and lost a lap on pit road. After getting his lap back and working his way up to thirteenth, Almirola hit the wall once again, setting the front of the car ablaze and ending the promising run. Almirola also returned to the Truck Series in 2012 on a part-time basis driving for his old crew chief Richie Wauters' No. 5 Ford.

In 2013, Almirola returned to Richard Petty Motorsports No. 43 in the Sprint Cup Series; at Martinsville Speedway in October, the team ran the No. 41 to honor Maurice Petty's induction into the NASCAR Hall of Fame. During the 2013 season from Texas to Talladega, he had the most consecutive top-tens in the 43 car since Bobby Hamilton in 1996. After being fastest in practice in Talladega, his crew chief, Todd Parrott, was suspended for violating NASCAR's substance abuse policy. Almirola finished a career high 18th in points. In 2014, he received crew chief Trent Owens, who is Richard Petty's nephew.

In January 2014, RPM announced a three-year contract extension with Almirola after working on one-year deals the previous two seasons. This coincided with sponsor Smithfield Foods stepping up to fund 29 races in each of the next three seasons with brands Smithfield, Farmland, Eckrich, and Gwaltney. Almirola had a rather slow start to 2014, being involved in a 12-car wreck in the 2014 Daytona 500. At Bristol, Almirola posted his best Cup finish to date, finishing third.

The next week at Auto Club Speedway during the 2014 Auto Club 400, Almirola got involved in an accident with Brian Scott. Almirola made a pass on Scott for fourth place. Scott controversially moved into the back of Almirola to wreck himself and Almirola. In a post-race interview, an angry Almirola retorted, "The 33 was obviously a dart without feathers and coming across the race track. He ran right into me. Man, he came from all the way at the bottom of the race track and ran into me. He's not even racing this series for points. He's out there having fun because his daddy gets to pay for it, and he wrecked us. That's frustrating."

At the 2014 Coke Zero 400, Almirola would earn his first career win in the Sprint Cup Series after avoiding two major wrecks, and leading the field when the race was called off after 112 laps due to rain. His win also marked the first victory by the Richard Petty Motorsports No. 43 since 1999, and 30 years to the day Richard Petty won his 200th race. On his big victory Almirola said "The good Lord was watching out for us today and we were meant to win. It's really special for me to win here. This is not only the 30th anniversary of this team's last win at Daytona, but it is my hometown, and I remember growing up watching Daytona 500s and Firecracker 400s here. To win is really special."

Despite scoring better than twentieth only four times in the next few races, Almirola's win clinched a berth in the 2014 Chase for the Sprint Cup, his first Chase appearance and the first for a Cuban driver. Almirola was eliminated from the championship chase after round 1 of the Chase.

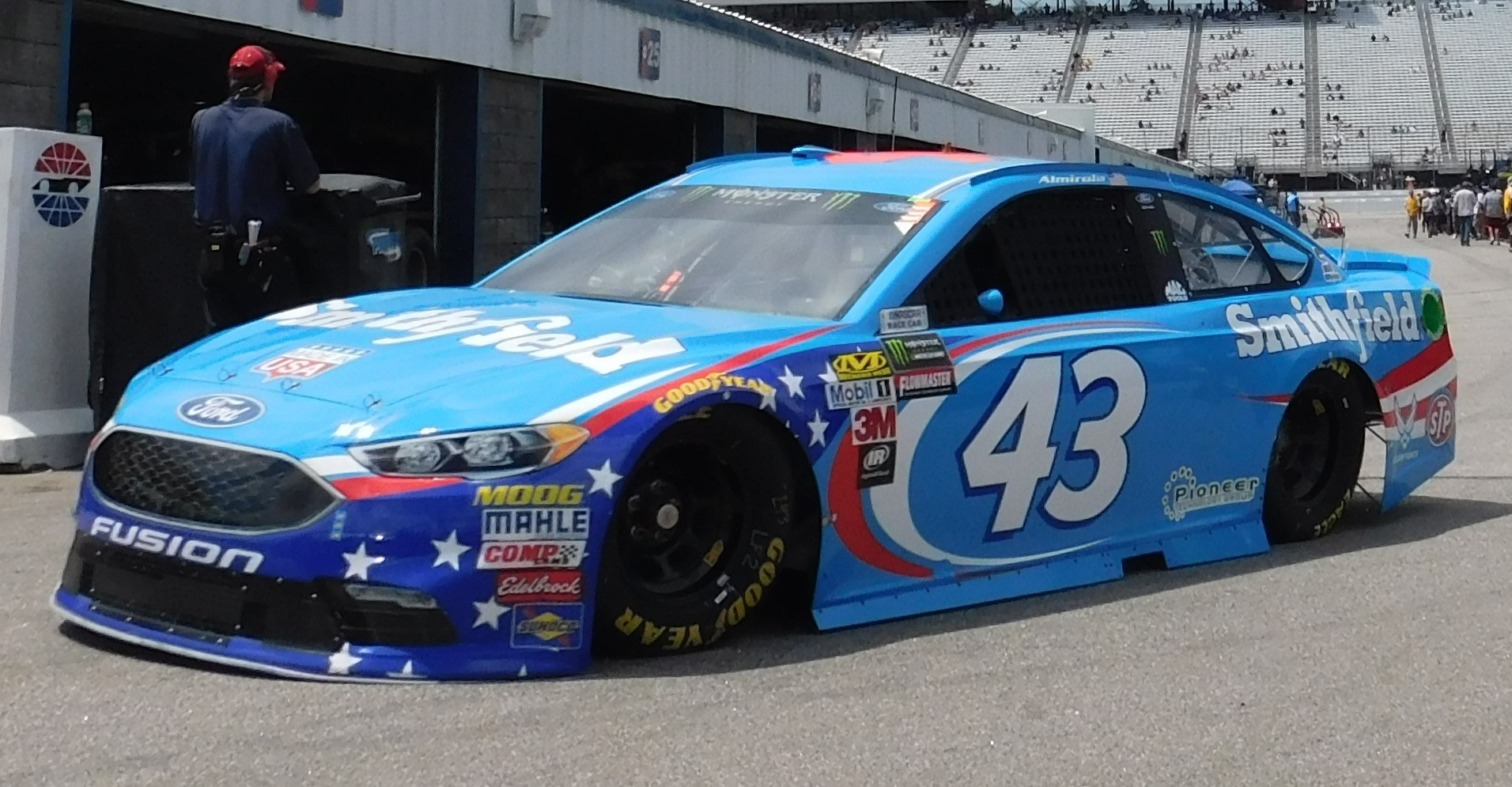
Almirola's No. 43 at New Hampshire Motor Speedway in 2017

Almirola had a more successful year in 2015 despite barely missing the Chase. He had only six top-tens, but he was mainly in the top-fifteen and was consistent all year long. He barely missed the chase by almost winning the Fall Richmond race with a strategy call and finished fourth. He finished seventeenth in the standings, the highest for a non-chaser.

Almirola returned to No. 43 in 2016 with Brian Scott as his new teammate.

In July 2016, Almirola, in the No. 98 car, won the Xfinity Series race at Daytona, his first Xfinity Series win since 2007. He barely beat Justin Allgaier by 0.003 seconds to win the race. A final lap caution came out, with Almirola being declared the winner on review. In victory lane, an ecstatic Almirola said that he considered the race to be his first Xfinity Series win, as he had won the 2007 Milwaukee race while Denny Hamlin drove 75% of the race. Almirola had a dismal 2016 season with just one top-ten finish.

Almirola started the 2017 season without a teammate and finished 4th at the 2017 Daytona 500. Almirola was hit with a 35-point penalty after the Talladega race. During the Go Bowling 400 at Kansas Speedway on May 13, 2017, Almirola was involved in a violent crash along with Joey Logano and Danica Patrick. After Logano's brake rotor exploded, he collided with Patrick, sending both straight into the wall. Almirola attempted to avoid the wreck but instead slammed into Logano. Although he was conscious, Almirola was cut out of his car, placed onto a stretcher, and airlifted to the University of Kansas Hospital. Almirola was diagnosed with a compression fracture of his T5 vertebrae, released from the University of Kansas Hospital after overnight observation and traveled back to North Carolina, where he had a follow-up consultation with his doctors in Charlotte. Almirola was also reported to have the ability to walk the day after his violent wreck. It was expected that he would miss eight–twelve weeks. He was replaced by Regan Smith for the Monster Energy Open, which led up to the Monster Energy NASCAR All-Star Race, the Coca-Cola 600, and the AAA 400 Drive for Autism. Bubba Wallace and Billy Johnson also substituted for Almirola. On June 29, 2017, Almirola stated he would undergo track tests in Charlotte or Darlington before being medically cleared to race in low-banking tracks like Indianapolis or New Hampshire to decrease stress on his back. On July 12, 2017, he announced he had been cleared to return to racing at Loudon's Overton's 301.

In September 2017, after sponsor Smithfield Foods announced that it would be leaving the team at season's end, Almirola announced his departure from Richard Petty Motorsports.

==== 2018–2023: Stewart–Haas Racing ====
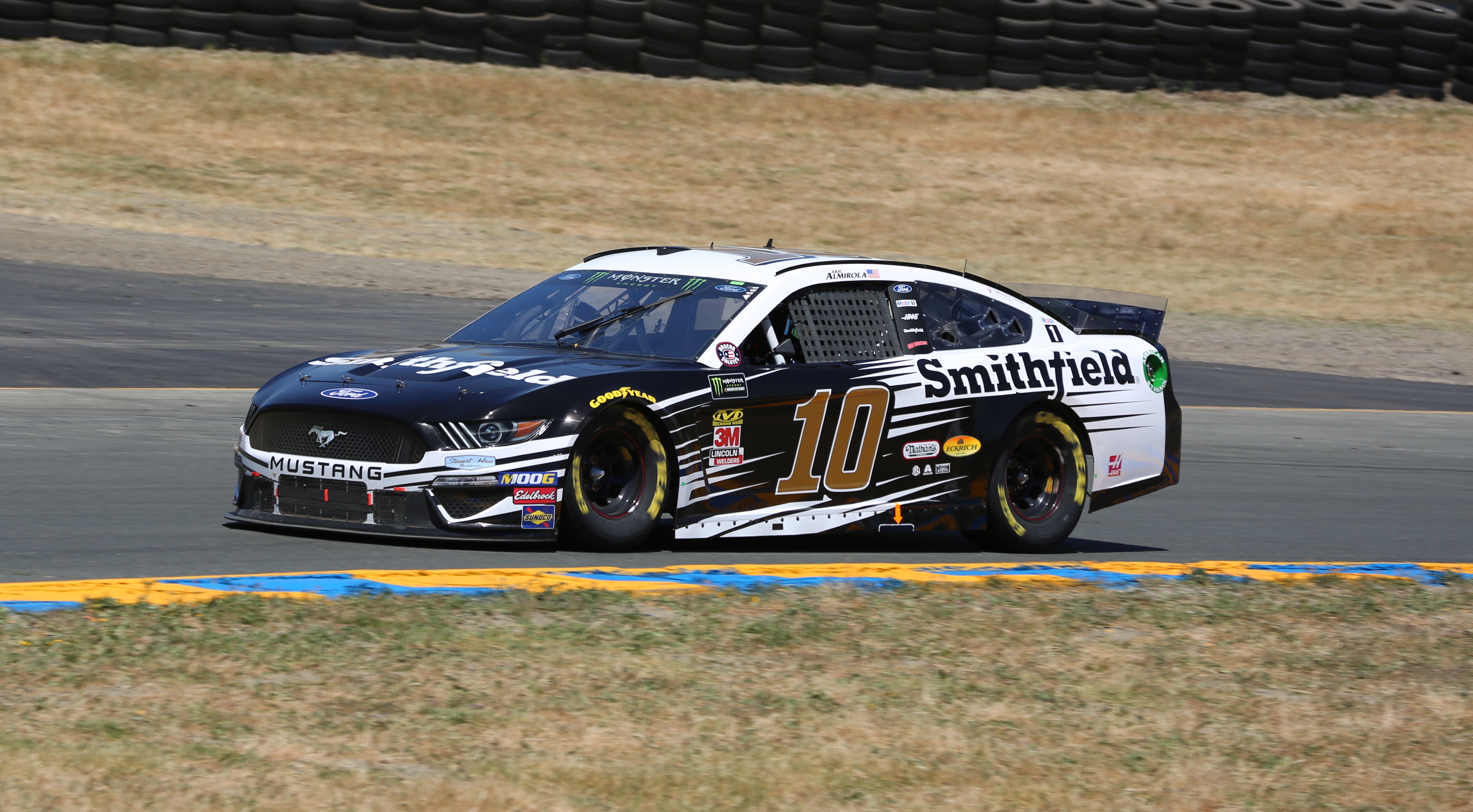
Almirola's No. 10 car at Sonoma Raceway in 2019

On November 8, 2017, Stewart–Haas Racing announced Almirola as the driver of the No. 10 Ford Fusion for the 2018 season. Almirola was leading the 2018 Daytona 500 when on the race's last lap Almirola and eventual race winner Austin Dillon collided, resulting in Almirola crashing into the outside wall and finishing eleventh. His consistency throughout the regular season brought him to the playoffs. At the inaugural Charlotte Roval race, Almirola was barely able to advance to the Round of 12 with a nineteenth-place finish after slamming the outside wall while avoiding William Byron, who cut a tire in front of him. He had a strong run at the fall Dover race until he got loose exiting the turn and collided with Brad Keselowski, which caused a multi-car pileup that took out Keselowski, Martin Truex Jr., and Alex Bowman. One week later, Almirola and Stewart–Haas Racing dominated the fall Talladega race. On the final lap, Almirola was running 2nd until his teammate Kurt Busch ran out of gas. Almirola scored his second career cup win, locking him into the Round of 8. Despite finishing fourth at Phoenix, Almirola was eliminated in the Round of 8. He finished the season fifth in the points standings, the highest finish of his career.

In the 2019 season, Almirola once again made the playoffs, but was eliminated in the Round of 16 after finishing fourteenth at the Charlotte Roval. Five weeks later, Almirola contended with teammate and pole-setter Kevin Harvick for the win at Texas before finishing in second-place, his best finish of the season. He fell to fourteenth in the final points standings. On December 4, 2019, Stewart–Haas Racing announced that Mike Bugarewicz will replace Johnny Klausmeier as the crew chief of the No. 10 team in 2020.

Almirola finished third at the 2020 GEICO 500 despite crossing the finish line nearly all the way backward after being spun by Ricky Stenhouse Jr. Almirola led the most laps and won the second stage at Pocono the following week, and looked to be in a position to win until a poor final pit stop cost him the lead. Almirola finished third. Almirola led 128 of the first 137 laps at Kentucky but his car did not do as well in lap traffic, and he was unable to regain the lead; Almirola's teammate Cole Custer won the race. Almirola's consistency got him in the Playoffs for the third year in a row. He made it to the Round of 12 but was eliminated after the Charlotte Roval.

In 2021, Almirola won his duel and started third in the Daytona 500, but contact with Christopher Bell triggered the big one and knocked Almirola out of the race on lap fourteen. It was the fourth consecutive year in which Almirola did not finish on the lead lap in the Daytona 500. At New Hampshire Motor Speedway, with 57 laps to go, Almirola passed Ryan Blaney for the lead. He went on to collect his third career win over Christopher Bell after NASCAR shortened the race by eight laps due to darkness. Almirola was eliminated from the playoffs following the conclusion of the Round of 16 at Bristol. He finished the season fifteenth in the points standings.

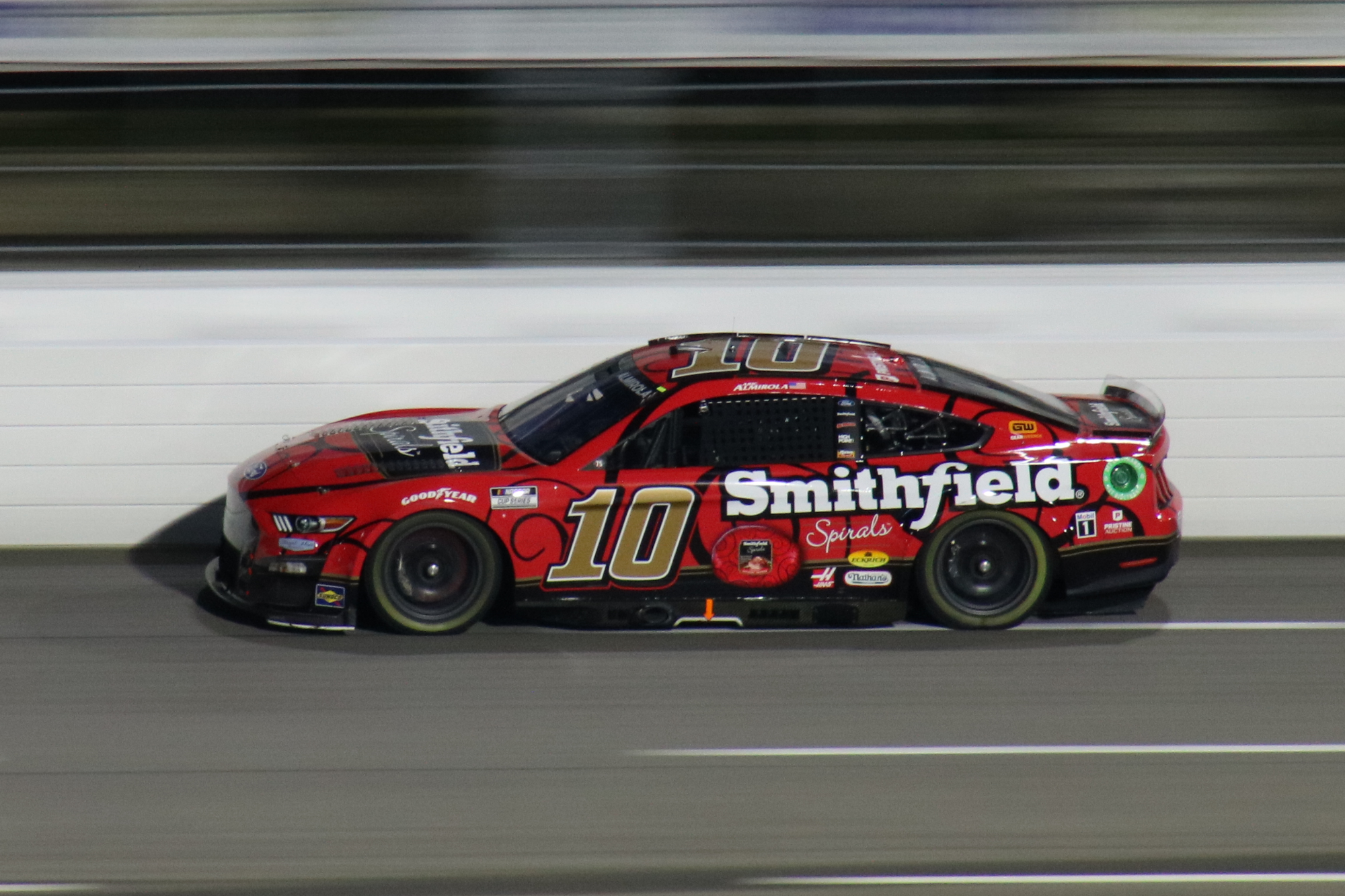
Aric Almirola racing at Martinsville in 2022.

On January 10, 2022, Almirola announced his retirement from full-time racing after the 2022 season. However, on August 19, 2022, Almirola announced he would not retire at the end of the season and would continue to drive the No. 10 in 2023. He started the season with a fifth-place finish at the 2022 Daytona 500. Despite having no wins, Almirola's finishes were a huge improvement over the previous season, with two top-fives and seven top-ten finishes. On October 28, 2023, Almirola announced he would not return to SHR in 2024.

Almirola returned to the Xfinity Series part-time in 2023 in two road course races. He drove the SS-Green Light Racing No. 08 to a 24th-place finish at Circuit of the Americas and the RSS Racing No. 28 at Sonoma, becoming the first-ever winner in the NXS at Sonoma as well as giving RSS their first ever win as an organization.

==== 2024–present: Return to Xfinity Series part-time ====
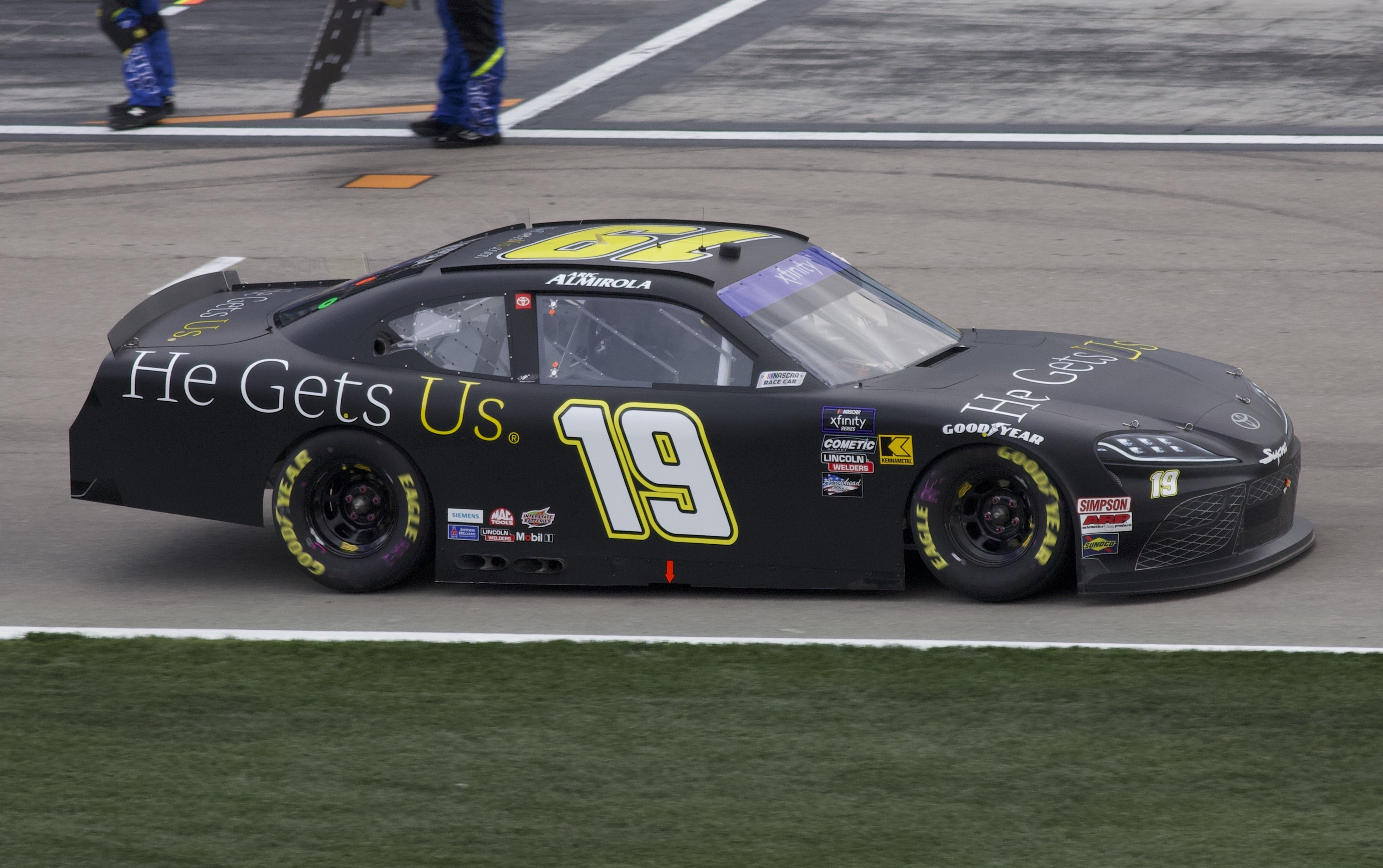
Almirola's No. 19 car at Las Vegas Motor Speedway in 2024.

In 2024, Almirola returned to Joe Gibbs Racing (JGR) in the Xfinity Series on a part-time schedule, driving the No. 19 and No. 20 cars. He claimed victory at Martinsville with the No. 20 team and earned a US$100,000 bonus by winning the first Dash 4 Cash race of the season. However, shortly before the Charlotte race, Almirola and Bubba Wallace were involved in a physical altercation during a weekly competition meeting attended by drivers from JGR and 23XI Racing. While the exact cause of the dispute remains unclear, the team identified Almirola as the instigator. As a result, JGR indefinitely suspended him and replaced him with Ty Gibbs, stating it was a team decision. Almirola later returned to competition at Indianapolis and found success during the playoffs, securing wins at Kansas and Martinsville. Despite only making fourteen starts, Almirola finished seventeenth in the final Xfinity Series driver standings, finishing ahead of ten full time Xfinity Series drivers. He earned three wins, six stage wins, eight top-fives, nine top-tens, eleven top-fifteens, and twelve top-twenties, led 415 laps, and had an average finish of 9.2.

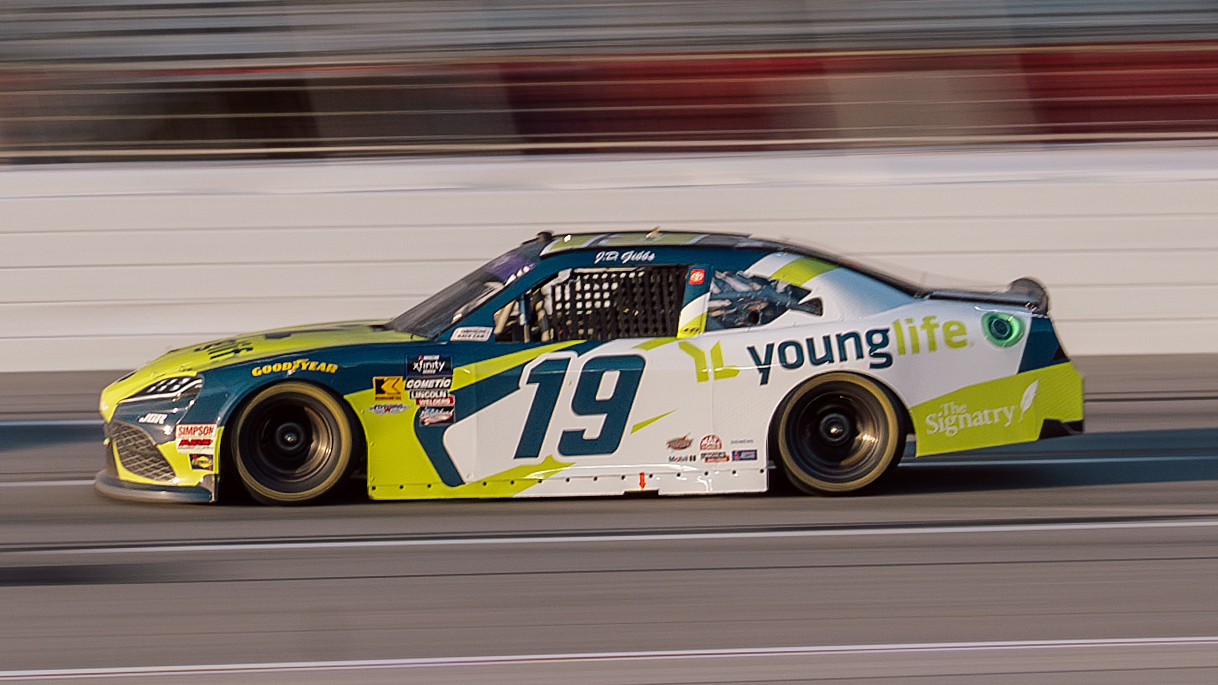
Almirola's No. 19 car at Atlanta Motor Speedway in 2025.

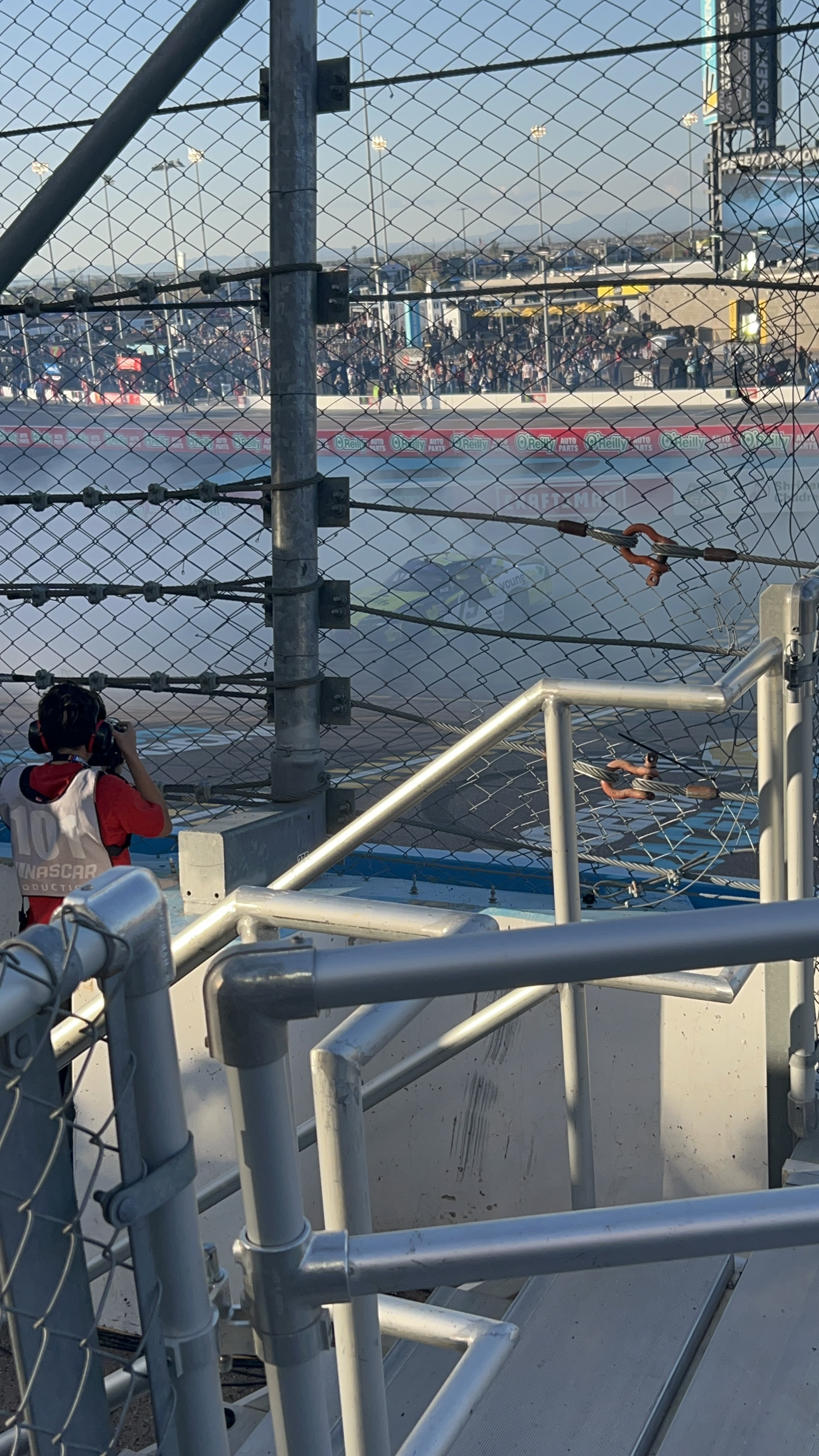
Almirola doing burn-outs after winning at Phoenix

In 2025, Almirola partnered with Joe Gibbs Racing and the Christian organization Young Life to compete part-time in the NASCAR Xfinity Series, participating in nine events. After a late-race caution at Phoenix, Almirola took over the lead from Justin Allgaier and made a last lap pass on Alex Bowman in an exciting photo finish to earn the win. Almirola beat Bowman by 0.045 seconds, the 26th closest finish in Xfinity Series history. At Indianapolis, Almirola was intentionally right-rear hooked by Austin Hill to the outside wall, having Hill be penalized five laps and suspended the following week. During the playoffs, Almirola won at Bristol and Las Vegas. With Almirola finishing second at Phoenix, the No. 19 car ended the season with the owners' championship.

== Personal life ==
Almirola was born at Eglin Air Force Base in Florida, and raised in Tampa. His family members are of Cuban descent. His grandfather, Sam Rodriguez, was a dirt sprint car driver.

A graduate of Hillsborough High School in Tampa, Almirola attended the University of Central Florida to work on a degree in mechanical engineering before leaving to pursue a career in racing.

Almirola is married to Janice Almirola, with whom he has two children Almirola danced with his children in a 2019 public service announcement for the Administration for Children and Families (ACF), part of the Responsible Fatherhood media campaign.

== Motorsports career results ==
=== NASCAR ===
(key) (Bold – Pole position awarded by qualifying time. Italics – Pole position earned by points standings or practice time. * – Most laps led.)

==== Cup Series ====
NASCAR Cup Series results
Year	Team	No.	Make	1	2	3	4	5	6	7	8	9	10	11	12	13	14	15	16	17	18	19	20	21	22	23	24	25	26	27	28	29	30	31	32	33	34	35	36	NCSC	Pts	Ref
2007	Joe Gibbs Racing	80	Chevy	DAY	CAL	LVS; 41	ATL	BRI	MAR	TEX	PHO	TAL	RCH	DAR	CLT	DOV	POC	MCH	SON	NHA	DAY	CHI	IND	POC	GLN	MCH														52nd	357	
2007	Dale Earnhardt, Inc.	01	Chevy																								BRI; 36	CAL; 31	RCH	NHA	DOV	KAN	TAL; 30	CLT	MAR; 43	ATL	TEX	PHO; 26	HOM	52nd	357	
2008	Dale Earnhardt, Inc.	8	Chevy	DAY	CAL	LVS	ATL	BRI; 8	MAR; 42	TEX	PHO	TAL; 33	RCH	DAR	CLT	DOV	POC	MCH	SON; 25	NHA; 23	DAY	CHI	IND	POC	GLN; 35	MCH	BRI; 13	CAL; 30	RCH	NHA; 18	DOV	KAN	TAL; 13	CLT	MAR; 20	ATL	TEX	PHO	HOM; 35	42nd	1075	
2009	Earnhardt Ganassi Racing	8	Chevy	DAY; 30	CAL; 35	LVS; 39	ATL; 21	BRI; 35	MAR; 37	TEX; 33	PHO	TAL	RCH	DAR	CLT	DOV	POC	MCH	SON	NHA	DAY	CHI	IND	POC	GLN	MCH														46th	527	
2009	Phoenix Racing	09	Dodge																								BRI; DNQ	ATL	RCH	NHA; 29	DOV	KAN	CAL	CLT	MAR	TAL	TEX	PHO	HOM	46th	527	
2010	Phoenix Racing	09	Chevy	DAY; DNQ	CAL; 43	LVS; 43	ATL; DNQ	BRI; 39	MAR; 41	PHO; DNQ	TEX																													48th	704	
2010	Tommy Baldwin Racing	35	Chevy									TAL; DNQ	RCH	DAR	DOV	CLT	POC	MCH	SON	NHA	DAY	CHI	IND	POC	GLN	MCH	BRI	ATL	RCH	NHA	DOV	KAN	CAL	CLT						48th	704	
2010	Richard Petty Motorsports	9	Ford																																MAR; 21	TAL; 20	TEX; 21	PHO; 27	HOM; 4	48th	704	
2012	Richard Petty Motorsports	43	Ford	DAY; 33	PHO; 12	LVS; 24	BRI; 19	CAL; 25	MAR; 8	TEX; 22	KAN; 23	RCH; 26	TAL; 12	DAR; 19	**CLT**; 16	DOV; 6	POC; 28	MCH; 17	SON; 28	KEN; 26	DAY; 19	NHA; 28	IND; 19	POC; 19	GLN; 18	MCH; 20	BRI; 35	ATL; 32	RCH; 26	CHI; 17	NHA; 23	DOV; 19	TAL; 19	CLT; 12	KAN; 29	MAR; 4	TEX; 15	PHO; 16	HOM; 7	20th	868	
2013	Richard Petty Motorsports	43	Ford	DAY; 13	PHO; 15	LVS; 16	BRI; 37	CAL; 14	MAR; 20	TEX; 7	KAN; 8	RCH; 8	TAL; 10	DAR; 20	CLT; 33	DOV; 18	POC; 21	MCH; 17	SON; 20	KEN; 15	DAY; 38	NHA; 5	IND; 17	POC; 20	GLN; 37	MCH; 18	BRI; 15	ATL; 20	RCH; 20	CHI; 13	NHA; 21	DOV; 22	KAN; 10	CLT; 23	TAL; 22		TEX; 27	PHO; 19	HOM; 16	18th	913	
2013	Richard Petty Motorsports	41	Ford																																	MAR; 20				18th	913	
2014	Richard Petty Motorsports	43	Ford	DAY; 39	PHO; 15	LVS; 25	BRI; 3	CAL; 43	MAR; 8	TEX; 12	DAR; 24	RCH; 17	TAL; 13	KAN; 8	CLT; 11	DOV; 12	POC; 22	MCH; 31	SON; 23	KEN; 39	DAY; 1	NHA; 23	IND; 21	POC; 35	GLN; 18	MCH; 20	BRI; 41	ATL; 9	RCH; 10	CHI; 41	NHA; 6	DOV; 28	KAN; 31	CLT; 22	TAL; 39	MAR; 21	TEX; 24	PHO; 18	HOM; 19	16th	2195	
2015	Richard Petty Motorsports	43	Ford	DAY; 15	ATL; 11	LVS; 26	PHO; 19	CAL; 11	MAR; 12	TEX; 19	BRI; 13	RCH; 20	TAL; 15	KAN; 11	CLT; 17	DOV; 5	POC; 43	MCH; 22	SON; 14	DAY; 34	KEN; 12	NHA; 15	IND; 38	POC; 18	GLN; 16	MCH; 14	BRI; 17	DAR; 11	RCH; 4	CHI; 10	NHA; 43	DOV; 5	CLT; 10	KAN; 24	TAL; 16	MAR; 16	TEX; 18	PHO; 10	HOM; 41	17th	940	
2016	Richard Petty Motorsports	43	Ford	DAY; 12	ATL; 15	LVS; 24	PHO; 13	CAL; 21	MAR; 40	TEX; 24	BRI; 34	RCH; 21	TAL; 27	KAN; 18	DOV; 31	CLT; 26	POC; 20	MCH; 26	SON; 27	DAY; 15	KEN; 20	NHA; 19	IND; 25	POC; 39	GLN; 27	BRI; 14	MCH; 25	DAR; 32	RCH; 17	CHI; 32	NHA; 17	DOV; 16	CLT; 15	KAN; 40	TAL; 8	MAR; 15	TEX; 22	PHO; 22	HOM; 40	26th	638	
2017	Richard Petty Motorsports	43	Ford	DAY; 4	ATL; 27	LVS; 14	PHO; 17	CAL; 19	MAR; 18	TEX; 18	BRI; 22	RCH; 9	TAL; 4	KAN; 38	CLT	DOV	POC	MCH	SON	DAY	KEN	NHA; 24	IND; 13	POC; 38	GLN; 21	MCH; 12	BRI; 37	DAR; 20	RCH; 17	CHI; 24	NHA; 26	DOV; 25	CLT; 24	TAL; 5	KAN; 9	MAR; 18	TEX; 15	PHO; 9	HOM; 18	29th	502	
2018	Stewart–Haas Racing	10	Ford	DAY; 11	ATL; 13	LVS; 10	PHO; 7	CAL; 12	MAR; 14	TEX; 32	BRI; 6	RCH; 17	TAL; 7	DOV; 11	KAN; 9	CLT; 13	POC; 7	MCH; 11	SON; 8	CHI; 25*	DAY; 27	KEN; 8	NHA; 3	POC; 25	GLN; 22	MCH; 7	BRI; 31	DAR; 14	IND; 23	LVS; 6	RCH; 5	ROV; 19	DOV; 13	TAL; 1	KAN; 10	MAR; 11	TEX; 8	PHO; 4	HOM; 9	5th	2354	
2019	Stewart–Haas Racing	10	Ford	DAY; 32	**ATL**; 8	LVS; 7	PHO; 4	CAL; 9	MAR; 9	TEX; 7	BRI; 37	RCH; 23	TAL; 9	DOV; 16	KAN; 12	CLT; 11	POC; 10	MCH; 17	SON; 9	CHI; 16	DAY; 7	KEN; 14	NHA; 11	POC; 12	GLN; 12	MCH; 33	BRI; 29	DAR; 17	IND; 14	LVS; 13	RCH; 16	ROV; 14	DOV; 17	TAL; 4	KAN; 23	MAR; 37	TEX; 2	PHO; 22	HOM; 22	14th	2234	
2020	Stewart–Haas Racing	10	Ford	DAY; 22	LVS; 21	CAL; 8	PHO; 8	DAR; 12	DAR; 7	CLT; 15	CLT; 20	BRI; 29	ATL; 17	MAR; 33	HOM; 5	TAL; 3	POC; 3*	POC; 5	IND; 3	KEN; 8*	TEX; 10	KAN; 6	NHA; 7	MCH; 16	MCH; 6	DRC; 24	DOV; 17	DOV; 7	DAY; 18	DAR; 9	RCH; 8	BRI; 5	LVS; 17	TAL; 37	ROV; 16	KAN; 13	TEX; 23	MAR; 7	PHO; 13	15th	2235	
2021	Stewart–Haas Racing	10	Ford	DAY; 34	DRC; 17	HOM; 30	LVS; 38	PHO; 11	ATL; 20	BRD; 36	MAR; 20	RCH; 6	TAL; 15	KAN; 29	DAR; 37	DOV; 37	COA; 26	CLT; 22	SON; 27	**NSH**; 4	POC; 16	POC; 16	ROA; 14	ATL; 23	NHA; 1	GLN; 16	IRC; 19	MCH; 17	DAY; 14	DAR; 16	RCH; 14	BRI; 18	LVS; 19	TAL; 26	ROV; 24	TEX; 18	KAN; 26	MAR; 6	PHO; 6	15th	2215	
2022	Stewart–Haas Racing	10	Ford	DAY; 5	CAL; 6	LVS; 6	PHO; 12	ATL; 22	COA; 19	RCH; 21	MAR; 8	BRD; 23	TAL; 13	DOV; 19	DAR; 11	KAN; 26	CLT; 17	GTW; 5	SON; 14	NSH; 17	ROA; 28	ATL; 8	NHA; 31	POC; 13	IRC; 38	MCH; 34	RCH; 8	GLN; 29	DAY; 21	DAR; 11	KAN; 21	**BRI**; 28	TEX; 24	TAL; 14*	ROV; 15	LVS; 18	HOM; 21	MAR; 15	PHO; 20	20th	760	
2023	Stewart–Haas Racing	10	Ford	DAY; 21	CAL; 35	LVS; 16	PHO; 33	ATL; 30	COA; 30	RCH; 13	BRD; 31	MAR; 6	TAL; 22	DOV; 24	KAN; 13	DAR; 21	CLT; 25	GTW; 19	SON; 28	NSH; 25	CSC; 12	**ATL**; 18*	NHA; 34	POC; 12	RCH; 8	MCH; 16	IRC; 39	GLN; 30	DAY; 3	DAR; 14	KAN; 17	BRI; 18	TEX; 18	**TAL**; 17	ROV; 21	LVS; 14	HOM; 9	MAR; 2	PHO; 13	22nd	675	

===== Daytona 500 =====
Year	Team	Manufacturer	Start	Finish
2009	Earnhardt Ganassi Racing	Chevrolet	11	30
2010	Phoenix Racing	Chevrolet	DNQ	
2012	Richard Petty Motorsports	Ford	27	33
2013	Richard Petty Motorsports	Ford	26	13
2014	Richard Petty Motorsports	Ford	13	39
2015	Richard Petty Motorsports	Ford	33	15
2016	Richard Petty Motorsports	Ford	34	12
2017	Richard Petty Motorsports	Ford	13	4
2018	Stewart–Haas Racing	Ford	37	11
2019	Stewart–Haas Racing	Ford	8	32
2020	Stewart–Haas Racing	Ford	5	22
2021	Stewart–Haas Racing	Ford	3	34
2022	Stewart–Haas Racing	Ford	38	5
2023	Stewart–Haas Racing	Ford	4	21

==== Xfinity Series ====
NASCAR Xfinity Series results
Year	Team	No.	Make	1	2	3	4	5	6	7	8	9	10	11	12	13	14	15	16	17	18	19	20	21	22	23	24	25	26	27	28	29	30	31	32	33	34	35	NXSC	Pts	Ref
2005	Joe Gibbs Racing	20	Chevy	DAY	CAL	MXC	LVS	ATL	NSH	BRI	TEX	PHO	TAL	DAR	RCH	CLT	DOV	NSH	KEN	MLW	DAY	CHI	NHA	PPR	GTW	IRP	GLN	MCH	BRI	CAL	RCH	DOV	KAN	CLT	MEM; QL^{†}	TEX	PHO	HOM	N/A	—	
2006	Joe Gibbs Racing	19	Chevy	DAY	CAL	MXC	LVS	ATL	BRI	TEX	NSH	PHO	TAL	RCH; 32	DAR	CLT	DOV; 11	NSH	KEN							IRP; 38	GLN	MCH; 27	BRI; 20	CAL	RCH; 18	DOV	KAN; 39	CLT; 15	MEM	TEX	PHO; 13	HOM	51st	833	
2006	Joe Gibbs Racing	20	Chevy																	**MLW**; QL^{†}	DAY	CHI	NHA	MAR; QL^{†}	GTW														51st	833	
2007	Joe Gibbs Racing	18	Chevy	**DAY**; 19	CAL	MXC	LVS	ATL; 27				PHO; 43			DAR; 41	CLT; 14	DOV						CHI; 38	GTW										CLT; 4	MEM	TEX	PHO	HOM; 18	29th	1959	
2007	Joe Gibbs Racing	20	Chevy						BRI; 32	NSH; 19	TEX		TAL; 20	RCH				NSH; 10	KEN; 6	**MLW**; 1	NHA	DAY; 28			**IRP**; 6	CGV; 11	GLN	MCH	BRI; 10	CAL	RCH	DOV	KAN						29th	1959	
2009	Key Motorsports	40	Chevy	DAY	CAL	LVS	BRI	TEX	NSH	PHO	TAL	RCH	DAR	CLT	DOV	NSH	KEN	MLW; 11	NHA	DAY	CHI	GTW	IRP; 14	IOW; 34	GLN	MCH	BRI	CGV	ATL	RCH	DOV	KAN	CAL						76th	394	
2009	Smith-Ganassi Racing	42	Dodge																															CLT; 27	MEM	TEX	PHO	HOM	76th	394	
2010	JR Motorsports	88	Chevy	DAY	CAL	LVS	BRI	NSH	PHO	TEX	TAL	RCH	DAR	DOV	CLT	NSH	KEN	ROA	NHA	DAY	CHI	GTW	IRP; 3	IOW	GLN	MCH	BRI	CGV	ATL			KAN; 22	CAL; 6	CLT; 8	GTW	TEX; 16	PHO; 6	HOM; 32	44th	1021	
2010	JR Motorsports	7	Chevy																											RCH; 11	DOV								44th	1021	
2011	JR Motorsports	88	Chevy	DAY; 19	PHO; 13	LVS; 15	BRI; 10	CAL; 9	TEX; 12	TAL; 8	NSH; 10	RCH; 14	DAR; 28	DOV; 9	IOW; 17	CLT; 9	CHI; 4	MCH; 15	ROA; 22	DAY; 9	KEN; 20	NHA; 5	NSH; 5	IRP; 4	IOW; 5	GLN; 8	CGV; 20	BRI; 5	ATL; 8	RCH; 7	CHI; 4	DOV; 15	KAN; 12	CLT; 15	TEX; 19	**PHO**; 25	HOM; 8		4th	1095	
2013	Richard Petty Motorsports	43	Ford	DAY	PHO; 9	LVS	BRI	CAL	TEX	RCH	TAL	DAR	CLT	DOV	IOW	MCH	ROA	KEN	DAY	NHA	CHI	IND	IOW	GLN	MOH	BRI	ATL	RCH	CHI	KEN	DOV	KAN	CLT	TEX	PHO	HOM			111th	0^{1}	
2014	Biagi-DenBeste Racing	98	Ford	DAY	PHO	LVS	BRI	CAL	TEX	DAR	RCH	TAL	IOW	CLT	DOV	MCH	ROA	KEN	DAY	NHA	CHI	IND	IOW	GLN	MOH	BRI	ATL	RCH	CHI; 14	KEN	DOV; 13	KAN	CLT	TEX	PHO	HOM			99th	0^{1}	
2015	Biagi-DenBeste Racing	98	Ford	DAY; 7	ATL	LVS; 11	PHO	CAL	TEX	BRI	RCH; 15	TAL; 10	IOW	CLT; 19	DOV	MCH; 8	CHI	DAY; 35	KEN	NHA	IND; 14	IOW	GLN	MOH	BRI	ROA	DAR	RCH	CHI	KEN	DOV	CLT	KAN	TEX	PHO	HOM; 12			93rd	0^{1}	
2016	Biagi-DenBeste Racing	98	Ford	DAY; 11	ATL	LVS; 12	PHO	CAL; 11	TEX; 17	BRI; 10	RCH	TAL; 10	DOV	CLT	POC; 11	MCH	IOW	DAY; 1	KEN	NHA	IND	IOW	GLN	MOH	BRI	ROA	DAR	RCH	CHI	KEN	DOV	CLT	KAN	TEX	PHO; 12	HOM; 10			92nd	0^{1}	
2017	Biagi-DenBeste Racing	98	Ford	DAY; 23	ATL; 19	LVS; 17	PHO	CAL	TEX	BRI	RCH	TAL; 1	CLT	DOV	POC	MCH	IOW	DAY	KEN	NHA	IND	IOW	GLN	MOH	BRI; 38	ROA	DAR	RCH	CHI	KEN	DOV	CLT	KAN	TEX	PHO	HOM			93rd	0^{1}	
2018	Stewart–Haas Racing with Biagi-DenBeste	98	Ford	DAY; 35	ATL	LVS	PHO	CAL	TEX	BRI	RCH	TAL	DOV	CLT	POC	MCH	IOW	CHI	DAY	KEN	NHA	IOW	GLN; 5	MOH	BRI	ROA	DAR	IND	LVS	RCH	ROV	DOV	KAN	TEX	PHO	HOM			98th	0^{1}	
2023	SS-Green Light Racing	08	Ford	DAY	CAL	LVS	PHO	ATL	COA; 24	RCH	MAR	TAL	DOV	DAR	CLT	PIR																							76th	0^{1}	
2023	RSS Racing	28	Ford														SON; 1	NSH	CSC	ATL	NHA	POC	ROA	MCH	IRC	GLN	DAY	DAR	KAN	BRI	TEX	ROV	LVS	HOM	MAR	PHO			76th	0^{1}	
2024	Joe Gibbs Racing	19	Toyota	DAY	ATL	LVS; 12	PHO; 31	COA																															17th	560	
2024	Joe Gibbs Racing	20	Toyota						RCH; 2*	MAR; 1*	TEX	TAL	DOV	DAR; 5	CLT	PIR	SON	IOW	NHA	NSH	CSC	POC	IND; 3	MCH	DAY	DAR	ATL	GLN; 26	BRI	KAN; 1	TAL; 19	ROV; 9	LVS; 13	HOM; 3	MAR; 1*	PHO; 3			17th	560	
2025	Joe Gibbs Racing	19	Toyota	DAY	ATL; 3	COA	PHO; 1	LVS; 2	HOM	MAR; 13	DAR	BRI	CAR	TAL; 33	TEX	CLT	NSH; 6	MXC	POC	ATL; 7*	CSC	SON	DOV; 2	IND; 35	IOW	GLN	DAY; 24	PIR	GTW; 6	BRI; 1	KAN	ROV; 14	LVS; 1*	TAL; 24	MAR; 5	PHO; 2			17th	652	
^{†} – Qualified for Denny Hamlin

==== Craftsman Truck Series ====
NASCAR Craftsman Truck Series results
Year	Team	No.	Make	1	2	3	4	5	6	7	8	9	10	11	12	13	14	15	16	17	18	19	20	21	22	23	24	25	NCTC	Pts	Ref
2005	Morgan-Dollar Motorsports	47	Chevy	DAY	CAL	ATL	MAR	GTW	MFD	CLT	DOV	TEX	MCH	MLW	KAN	KEN	MEM; 30	IRP; 10	NSH	BRI	RCH	NHA; 8	LVS	MAR	ATL	TEX; 34	PHO	HOM	48th	410	
2006	Spears Motorsports	75	Chevy	DAY; 32	CAL; 21	ATL; 18	MAR; 18	GTW; 10	CLT; 9	MFD; 30	DOV; 12	TEX; 32	MCH; 36	MLW; 13	KAN; 18	KEN; 22	MEM; 18	IRP; 21	NSH; 22	BRI; 32	NHA; 29	LVS; 10	TAL; 22	MAR; 16	ATL; 30	TEX; 20	PHO; 22	HOM; 23	18th	2471	
2007	Billy Ballew Motorsports	51	Chevy	DAY	CAL	ATL	MAR	KAN	CLT	MFD	DOV	TEX	MCH	MLW	MEM; 17	KEN	IRP												60th	273	
2007	Morgan-Dollar Motorsports	47	Chevy															NSH; 23	BRI	GTW	NHA; 32	LVS	TAL	MAR	ATL	TEX	PHO	HOM	60th	273	
2008	Morgan-Dollar Motorsports	46	Chevy	DAY	CAL	ATL	MAR	KAN	CLT	MFD	DOV	TEX; 17	MCH	MLW	MEM	KEN	IRP	NSH	BRI	GTW	NHA	LVS	TAL	MAR	ATL	TEX	PHO	HOM	78th	112	
2009	Billy Ballew Motorsports	15	Toyota	DAY	CAL	ATL	MAR	KAN	CLT	DOV	TEX; 16	MCH	MLW; 20	MEM; 4	KEN; 5	IRP; 3	NSH	BRI; 6	CHI; 8	IOW; 2		NHA; 21		MAR; 12	TAL; 2	TEX; 14	PHO; 3	HOM; 14	20th	2301	
2009	Billy Ballew Motorsports	51	Toyota																		GTW; 4		LVS; 8						20th	2301	
2010	Billy Ballew Motorsports	51	Toyota	DAY; 12	ATL; 3	MAR; 6	NSH; 8	KAN; 7	DOV; 1	CLT; 7	TEX; 12	MCH; 1	IOW; 28	GTW; 8	IRP; 31	POC; 4	NSH; 3	DAR; 9	BRI; 2	CHI; 6	KEN; 3	NHA; 8	LVS; 6	MAR; 5	TAL; 2	TEX; 7	PHO; 5	HOM; 5	2nd	3730	
2011	Vision Aviation Racing	51	Toyota	DAY; 22	PHO	DAR	MAR	NSH	DOV	CLT	KAN	TEX	KEN	IOW	NSH	IRP	POC	MCH	BRI	ATL	CHI	NHA	KEN	LVS	TAL	MAR	TEX	HOM	104th	0^{1}	
2012	Wauters Motorsports	5	Ford	DAY	MAR	CAR	KAN	CLT	DOV	TEX	KEN	IOW	CHI	POC	MCH	BRI	ATL; 5	IOW	KEN	LVS	TAL; 26	MAR	TEX; 9	PHO	HOM				90th	0^{1}	
2024	Hattori Racing Enterprises	16	Toyota	DAY	ATL	LVS	BRI	COA	MAR	TEX	KAN	DAR	NWS; DNQ	CLT	GTW	NSH	POC	IRP	RCH	MLW	BRI	KAN	TAL	HOM	MAR	PHO			91st	0^{1}	

^{*} Season still in progress
^{1} Ineligible for series points

=== ARCA Re/Max Series ===
(key) (Bold – Pole position awarded by qualifying time. Italics – Pole position earned by points standings or practice time. * – Most laps led.)

ARCA Re/Max Series results
Year	Team	No.	Make	1	2	3	4	5	6	7	8	9	10	11	12	13	14	15	16	17	18	19	20	21	22	23	ARSC	Pts	Ref
2005	Joe Gibbs Racing	2	Chevy	DAY	NSH	SLM	KEN	TOL	LAN	MIL	POC	MCH	KAN	KEN	BLN	POC	GTW	LER	NSH	MCH	ISF	TOL	DSF	CHI	SLM	TAL; 37	171st	45	
2008	Dale Earnhardt, Inc.	29	Chevy	DAY	SLM	IOW	KAN	CAR	KEN	TOL	POC	MCH	CAY	KEN	BLN	POC; 34	NSH	ISF	DSF	CHI	SLM	NJE	TAL	TOL			143rd	70	

==== Camping World East Series ====
NASCAR Camping World East Series results
Year	Team	No.	Make	1	2	3	4	5	6	7	8	9	10	11	12	13	NCWEC	Pts	Ref
2008	Dale Earnhardt, Inc.	8	Chevy	GRE	IOW	SBO	GLN	NHA	TMP	NSH	ADI	LRP	MFD	NHA	DOV; 1	STA	149th	185	

==== K&N Pro Series West ====
NASCAR K&N Pro Series West results
Year	Team	No.	Make	1	2	3	4	5	6	7	8	9	10	11	12	13	14	NKNPSWC	Pts	Ref
2018	Stewart–Haas Racing	41	Ford	KCR	TUS	TUS	OSS	CNS	SON; 2	DCS	IOW	EVG	GTW	LVS	MER	AAS	KCR	30th	43	

== See also ==
- List of Cuban Americans
- List of people from Tampa, Florida
