= 2017 Daytona 500 =

Auto race held in 2017

Race details
- Race 1 of 36 in the 2017 Monster Energy NASCAR Cup Series
- Date: February 26, 2017
- Location: Daytona International Speedway in Daytona Beach, Florida
- Course: Permanent racing facility 2.5 mi (4 km)
- Distance: 200 laps, 500 mi (800 km)
- Average speed: 143.187 mph (230.437 km/h)

Pole position
| Driver | Chase Elliott | Hendrick Motorsports |
- Time: 46.663

Qualifying race winners
| Duel 1 Winner | Chase Elliott | Hendrick Motorsports |
| Duel 2 Winner | Denny Hamlin | Joe Gibbs Racing |

Most laps led
| Driver | Kevin Harvick | Stewart–Haas Racing |
- Laps: 50

Winner
| No. 41 | Kurt Busch | Stewart–Haas Racing |

Television in the United States
- Network: Fox
- Announcers: Mike Joy, Jeff Gordon and Darrell Waltrip
- Nielsen ratings: 6.5/15 (Overnight); 6.6/15 (Final); 11.9 million viewers

Radio in the United States
- Radio: MRN
- Booth announcers: Joe Moore, Jeff Striegle and Rusty Wallace
- Turn announcers: Dave Moody (1 & 2), Mike Bagley (Backstretch) and Kyle Rickey (3 & 4)

The 2017 Daytona 500, the 59th running of the event, was held on February 26, 2017, and was won by Kurt Busch of Stewart–Haas Racing after Chase Elliott and Kyle Larson ran out of fuel over the final laps of the race. This was Busch's first Daytona 500 win, and his first career win on a restrictor plate track. Ryan Blaney finished second, and A. J. Allmendinger finished third. This race was contested for 200 laps on the 2.5-mile (4.0 km) asphalt superspeedway. It was the first race of the 2017 Monster Energy NASCAR Cup Series season, and also marked the first race for Monster Energy as the new title sponsor for NASCAR's top series, replacing Sprint. This was the final Daytona 500 for 2004 and 2014 winner Dale Earnhardt Jr., as he retired from NASCAR Cup competition after 2017.

== Background ==
=== Race format and rule changes ===
All three of NASCAR's main national series adopted a new race format and points system for the 2017 season. Under the new format, each race was divided into three stages. A competition caution is held at the end of the first and second stage, and bonus championship points are awarded to the top 10 drivers. For the 500, the first and second stages each comprised 60 laps of the scheduled distance, with the remainder comprising the third. The leader at the end of each stage, including the overall winner, also receives points that are carried over into their total if they qualify for the season-ending playoffs (renamed from the Chase for the Championship).

The race also introduced stricter rules in regard to vehicle repair after on-track accidents; teams are only allowed to repair their cars on pit road in five-minute windows with six crew members, starting once the car crosses the pit road commitment line, and ending when it reaches minimum speed after exiting pit road. Repairs are restricted to repairing sheet metal and re-attaching or reinforcing body panels; body panels may not be replaced. If the vehicle cannot be repaired on pit road and must be taken to the garage, more than six crew members work on the vehicle, or the five-minute clock expires, the vehicle will be removed from the race and cannot return.

Other technical changes took place for the 2017 season and Daytona 500, including having one fewer set of tires available for the race, teams being required to start the race with the same tires used in qualifying, restrictor plate size openings reduced from 57/64 inch (23 mm) to 7/8 inch (22 mm), and new structural safety features—some of which are specifically mandated at Daytona and Talladega.

== Entry list ==
| No. | Driver | Team | Manufacturer |
|---|---|---|---|
| 1 | Jamie McMurray (W) | Chip Ganassi Racing | Chevrolet |
| 2 | Brad Keselowski | Team Penske | Ford |
| 3 | Austin Dillon | Richard Childress Racing | Chevrolet |
| 4 | Kevin Harvick (W) | Stewart–Haas Racing | Ford |
| 5 | Kasey Kahne | Hendrick Motorsports | Chevrolet |
| 6 | Trevor Bayne (W) | Roush Fenway Racing | Ford |
| 7 | Elliott Sadler | Tommy Baldwin Racing | Chevrolet |
| 10 | Danica Patrick | Stewart–Haas Racing | Ford |
| 11 | Denny Hamlin (W) | Joe Gibbs Racing | Toyota |
| 13 | Ty Dillon (R) | Germain Racing | Chevrolet |
| 14 | Clint Bowyer | Stewart–Haas Racing | Ford |
| 15 | Michael Waltrip (W) | Premium Motorsports | Toyota |
| 17 | Ricky Stenhouse Jr. | Roush Fenway Racing | Ford |
| 18 | Kyle Busch | Joe Gibbs Racing | Toyota |
| 19 | Daniel Suárez (R) | Joe Gibbs Racing | Toyota |
| 20 | Matt Kenseth (W) | Joe Gibbs Racing | Toyota |
| 21 | Ryan Blaney | Wood Brothers Racing | Ford |
| 22 | Joey Logano (W) | Team Penske | Ford |
| 23 | Joey Gase (i) | BK Racing | Toyota |
| 24 | Chase Elliott | Hendrick Motorsports | Chevrolet |
| 27 | Paul Menard | Richard Childress Racing | Chevrolet |
| 31 | Ryan Newman (W) | Richard Childress Racing | Chevrolet |
| 32 | Matt DiBenedetto | Go Fas Racing | Ford |
| 33 | Jeffrey Earnhardt | Circle Sport – The Motorsports Group | Chevrolet |
| 34 | Landon Cassill | Front Row Motorsports | Ford |
| 37 | Chris Buescher | JTG Daugherty Racing | Chevrolet |
| 38 | David Ragan | Front Row Motorsports | Ford |
| 41 | Kurt Busch | Stewart–Haas Racing | Ford |
| 42 | Kyle Larson | Chip Ganassi Racing | Chevrolet |
| 43 | Aric Almirola | Richard Petty Motorsports | Ford |
| 47 | A. J. Allmendinger | JTG Daugherty Racing | Chevrolet |
| 48 | Jimmie Johnson (W) | Hendrick Motorsports | Chevrolet |
| 51 | Timmy Hill | Rick Ware Racing | Chevrolet |
| 55 | Reed Sorenson | Premium Motorsports | Toyota |
| 72 | Cole Whitt | TriStar Motorsports | Ford |
| 75 | Brendan Gaughan | Beard Motorsports | Chevrolet |
| 77 | Erik Jones (R) | Furniture Row Racing | Toyota |
| 78 | Martin Truex Jr. | Furniture Row Racing | Toyota |
| 83 | Corey LaJoie (R) | BK Racing | Toyota |
| 88 | Dale Earnhardt Jr. (W) | Hendrick Motorsports | Chevrolet |
| 95 | Michael McDowell | Leavine Family Racing | Chevrolet |
| 96 | D. J. Kennington | Gaunt Brothers Racing | Toyota |
Official entry list

== Practice ==
=== First practice (February 18) ===
Joey Logano was the fastest in the first practice session with a time of 46.604 seconds and a speed of 193.116 mph (310.790 km/h).

| Pos | No. | Driver | Team | Manufacturer | Time | Speed |
|---|---|---|---|---|---|---|
| 1 | 22 | Joey Logano | Team Penske | Ford | 46.604 | 193.116 |
| 2 | 43 | Aric Almirola | Richard Petty Motorsports | Ford | 46.619 | 193.054 |
| 3 | 2 | Brad Keselowski | Team Penske | Ford | 46.621 | 193.046 |
Official first practice results

== Qualifying ==
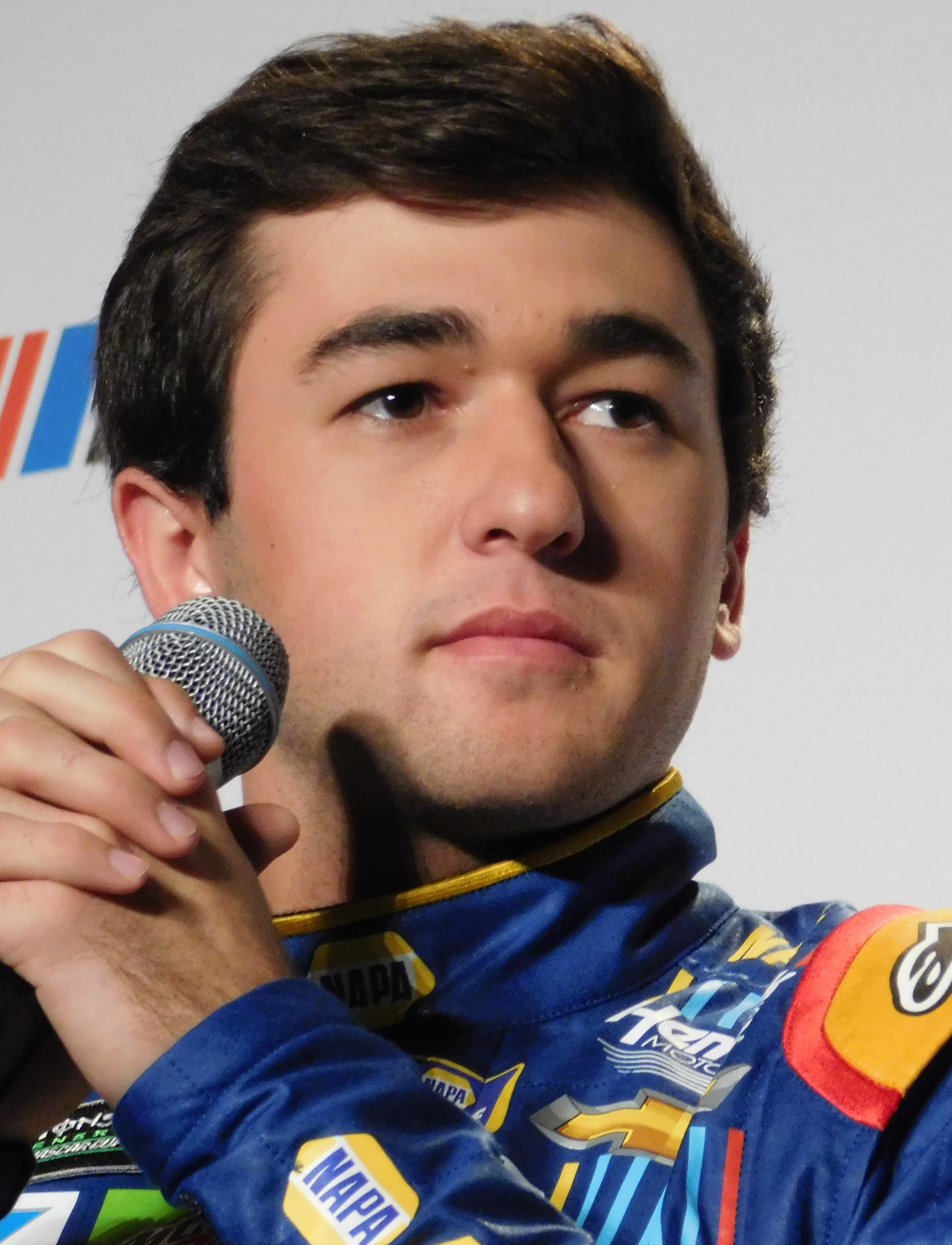
Chase Elliott became the first driver to win two consecutive Daytona 500 poles since Ken Schrader in 1989 and 1990.

Qualifying for the Daytona 500 is different from any other race weekend because the starting lineup for the race, except for the two drivers that post the two fastest timed laps in the final round of qualifying, isn't set on qualifying day. It sets the lineup for the two Duel races the following Thursday.

Unlike qualifying at non-restrictor plate races, qualifying at Daytona International Speedway and Talladega Superspeedway consists of two rounds of cars being sent out one at a time to make a single timed lap. The fastest 12 advance to the final round to run for the pole position.

Chase Elliott scored the pole for the Daytona 500 with a time of 46.663 and a speed of 192.872 mph (310.397 km/h). He said afterwards that everyone at Hendrick Motorsports did "a lot of work this off-season. This team definitely has a knack for these plate tracks, as they showed with Jeff Gordon and then last year with here and Talladega." He also mentioned how these accomplishments don't "just happen by staying the same, as everybody knows. Everyone is always trying to get better and make their cars better and faster, and the engine shop is always finding new things. So I think that's just proof that they're improving with everybody else and taking that next step, which is really impressive." He ended by saying he was "happy to be a part of it, and hopefully we can run good next Sunday."

=== Qualifying results ===
| Pos | No. | Driver | Team | Manufacturer | R1 | R2 |
|---|---|---|---|---|---|---|
| 1 | 24 | Chase Elliott | Hendrick Motorsports | Chevrolet | 46.800 | 46.663 |
| 2 | 88 | Dale Earnhardt Jr. | Hendrick Motorsports | Chevrolet | 46.810 | 46.665 |
| 3 | 2 | Brad Keselowski | Team Penske | Ford | 46.820 | 46.707 |
| 4 | 14 | Clint Bowyer | Stewart–Haas Racing | Ford | 46.854 | 46.736 |
| 5 | 78 | Martin Truex Jr. | Furniture Row Racing | Toyota | 46.826 | 46.800 |
| 6 | 11 | Denny Hamlin | Joe Gibbs Racing | Toyota | 46.845 | 46.823 |
| 7 | 4 | Kevin Harvick | Stewart–Haas Racing | Ford | 46.867 | 46.829 |
| 8 | 5 | Kasey Kahne | Hendrick Motorsports | Chevrolet | 46.864 | 46.853 |
| 9 | 20 | Matt Kenseth | Joe Gibbs Racing | Toyota | 46.840 | 46.871 |
| 10 | 31 | Ryan Newman | Richard Childress Racing | Chevrolet | 46.859 | 46.876 |
| 11 | 18 | Kyle Busch | Joe Gibbs Racing | Toyota | 46.855 | 46.932 |
| 12 | 13 | Ty Dillon (R) | Germain Racing | Chevrolet | 46.869 | 47.009 |
| 13 | 17 | Ricky Stenhouse Jr. | Roush Fenway Racing | Ford | 46.874 | — |
| 14 | 48 | Jimmie Johnson | Hendrick Motorsports | Chevrolet | 46.900 | — |
| 15 | 19 | Daniel Suárez (R) | Joe Gibbs Racing | Toyota | 46.905 | — |
| 16 | 42 | Kyle Larson | Chip Ganassi Racing | Chevrolet | 46.923 | — |
| 17 | 22 | Joey Logano | Team Penske | Ford | 46.929 | — |
| 18 | 21 | Ryan Blaney | Wood Brothers Racing | Ford | 46.937 | — |
| 19 | 6 | Trevor Bayne | Roush Fenway Racing | Ford | 46.944 | — |
| 20 | 77 | Erik Jones (R) | Furniture Row Racing | Toyota | 46.950 | — |
| 21 | 27 | Paul Menard | Richard Childress Racing | Chevrolet | 46.989 | — |
| 22 | 41 | Kurt Busch | Stewart–Haas Racing | Ford | 47.017 | — |
| 23 | 1 | Jamie McMurray | Chip Ganassi Racing | Chevrolet | 47.023 | — |
| 24 | 10 | Danica Patrick | Stewart–Haas Racing | Ford | 47.042 | — |
| 25 | 43 | Aric Almirola | Richard Petty Motorsports | Ford | 47.123 | — |
| 26 | 3 | Austin Dillon | Richard Childress Racing | Chevrolet | 47.127 | — |
| 27 | 34 | Landon Cassill | Front Row Motorsports | Ford | 47.285 | — |
| 28 | 47 | A. J. Allmendinger | JTG Daugherty Racing | Chevrolet | 47.298 | — |
| 29 | 32 | Matt DiBenedetto | Go Fas Racing | Ford | 47.355 | — |
| 30 | 95 | Michael McDowell | Leavine Family Racing | Chevrolet | 47.438 | — |
| 31 | 37 | Chris Buescher | JTG Daugherty Racing | Chevrolet | 47.513 | — |
| 32 | 38 | David Ragan | Front Row Motorsports | Ford | 47.518 | — |
| 33 | 75 | Brendan Gaughan (i)* | Beard Motorsports | Chevrolet | 47.545 | — |
| 34 | 72 | Cole Whitt | TriStar Motorsports | Ford | 47.592 | — |
| 35 | 15 | Michael Waltrip | Premium Motorsports | Toyota | 47.599 | — |
| 36 | 7 | Elliott Sadler (i)* | Tommy Baldwin Racing | Chevrolet | 47.730 | — |
| 37 | 55 | Reed Sorenson | Premium Motorsports | Toyota | 48.043 | — |
| 38 | 96 | D. J. Kennington | Gaunt Brothers Racing | Toyota | 48.175 | — |
| 39 | 23 | Joey Gase (i) | BK Racing | Toyota | 48.428 | — |
| 40 | 83 | Corey LaJoie (R) | BK Racing | Toyota | 48.584 | — |
| 41 | 33 | Jeffrey Earnhardt | Circle Sport – The Motorsports Group | Chevrolet | 48.710 | — |
| 42 | 51 | Timmy Hill (i) | Rick Ware Racing | Chevrolet | 48.886 | — |
Official Qualifying Results

- -Indicates open team. Gaughan and Sadler were the two fastest open teams in qualifying.

== Practice (post–qualifying) ==
Both practice sessions scheduled for Thursday following qualifying was cancelled due to rain.

== Can-Am Duels ==
The Can-Am Duels are a pair of NASCAR Sprint Cup Series races held in conjunction with the Daytona 500 annually in February at Daytona International Speedway. They consist of two races 60 laps and 150 miles (240 km) in length, which serve as heat races that set the lineup for the Daytona 500. The first race sets the lineup for cars that qualified in odd-numbered positions on pole qualifying day, while the second race sets the lineup for cars that qualified in even-numbered positions. The Duels set the lineup for positions 3–38, while positions 39 and 40 are filled by the two "Open" (teams without a charter) cars that set the fastest times in qualifying, but did not lock in a spot in the Duels.

=== Duel 1 ===
Chase Elliott held off late charges in the closing laps to win the first Can-Am Duel race.

Restarting with eight laps to go, the Fords of Kevin Harvick and Brad Keselowski formed a line on the top side to make a charge at him. The line started stalling out with five to go and was no match for Elliott, only challenged by Harvick and Jamie McMurray.

He said in victory lane that he certainly thought he had a chance of winning on Sunday and that if he "didn't feel that way...I'd stay home. I feel like we have a shot on Sunday. I feel like we had a shot before we got down here. Tonight's result hasn't changed my opinion on that. I'm looking forward to it, obviously. You love to get that qualifying spot on Sunday, but we really earned it tonight, to start on the front row, which is even better. It was definitely a great way to start the season."

The eight-lap run to the finish was set up by a two-car wreck with 12 laps to go. Coming through the tri-oval heading towards Turn 1, Corey LaJoie rear-ended Reed Sorenson, who checked up, turning Sorenson down into Paul Menard, sending Sorenson down the track and into the inside retaining wall. Sorenson, who missed the race as a result of this wreck, said he guessed LaJoie "felt like he did what he had to do to make the race. I hope he's proud of that part of it. There's a lot of pressure going in to making this race. It's a very big deal for a small team like ours."

==== Duel 1 results ====
| Pos | Grid | No | Driver | Team | Manufacturer | Laps | Points |
|---|---|---|---|---|---|---|---|
| 1 | 1 | 24 | Chase Elliott | Hendrick Motorsports | Chevrolet | 60 | 10 |
| 2 | 12 | 1 | Jamie McMurray | Chip Ganassi Racing | Chevrolet | 60 | 9 |
| 3 | 4 | 4 | Kevin Harvick | Stewart–Haas Racing | Ford | 60 | 8 |
| 4 | 2 | 2 | Brad Keselowski | Team Penske | Ford | 60 | 7 |
| 5 | 5 | 20 | Matt Kenseth | Joe Gibbs Racing | Toyota | 60 | 6 |
| 6 | 10 | 6 | Trevor Bayne | Roush Fenway Racing | Ford | 60 | 5 |
| 7 | 13 | 43 | Aric Almirola | Richard Petty Motorsports | Ford | 60 | 4 |
| 8 | 9 | 22 | Joey Logano | Team Penske | Ford | 60 | 3 |
| 9 | 18 | 72 | Cole Whitt | TriStar Motorsports | Ford | 60 | 2 |
| 10 | 8 | 19 | Daniel Suárez (R) | Joe Gibbs Racing | Toyota | 60 | 1 |
| 11 | 6 | 18 | Kyle Busch | Joe Gibbs Racing | Toyota | 60 | 0 |
| 12 | 7 | 17 | Ricky Stenhouse Jr. | Roush Fenway Racing | Ford | 60 | 0 |
| 13 | 15 | 32 | Matt DiBenedetto | Go Fas Racing | Ford | 60 | 0 |
| 14 | 14 | 34 | Landon Cassill | Front Row Motorsports | Ford | 60 | 0 |
| 15 | 20 | 23 | Joey Gase (i) | BK Racing | Toyota | 60 | 0 |
| 16 | 21 | 83 | Corey LaJoie (R) | BK Racing | Toyota | 60 | 0 |
| 17 | 17 | 75 | Brendan Gaughan (i) | Beard Motorsports | Chevrolet | 60 | 0 |
| 18 | 11 | 27 | Paul Menard | Richard Childress Racing | Chevrolet | 59 | 0 |
| 19 | 19 | 55 | Reed Sorenson | Premium Motorsports | Toyota | 48 | 0 |
| 20 | 3 | 78 | Martin Truex Jr. | Furniture Row Racing | Toyota | 60 | 0 |
| 21 | 16 | 37 | Chris Buescher | JTG Daugherty Racing | Chevrolet | 60 | 0 |
Official race results

=== Duel 2 ===
Dale Earnhardt Jr. dominated the second Duel race leading 53 of 60 laps. That total, however, didn't include the final lap as he lost the lead for the victory on the final lap to Denny Hamlin.

Hamlin received a push from Austin Dillon and faked Earnhardt out on the backstretch to pass him going into Turn 3 to win the second Duel race. He credited Dillon for the "great push there....We worked really well together that entire race. I'll keep that in mind in the 500....I can't thank this team enough for a great job by Wheels (Mike Wheeler, crew chief). FedEx announced their renewal today so that's a great sign of a great year hopefully to come."

With 18 laps remaining, Ryan Blaney and Jimmie Johnson made contact on the backstretch. Five laps later, Johnson blows a right-side tire and slams the wall in Turn 3, setting up the final nine laps.

==== Duel 2 results ====
| Pos | Grid | No | Driver | Team | Manufacturer | Laps | Points |
|---|---|---|---|---|---|---|---|
| 1 | 3 | 11 | Denny Hamlin | Joe Gibbs Racing | Toyota | 60 | 10 |
| 2 | 2 | 14 | Clint Bowyer | Stewart–Haas Racing | Ford | 60 | 9 |
| 3 | 11 | 41 | Kurt Busch | Stewart–Haas Racing | Ford | 60 | 8 |
| 4 | 13 | 3 | Austin Dillon | Richard Childress Racing | Chevrolet | 60 | 7 |
| 5 | 1 | 88 | Dale Earnhardt Jr. | Hendrick Motorsports | Chevrolet | 60 | 6 |
| 6 | 12 | 10 | Danica Patrick | Stewart–Haas Racing | Ford | 60 | 5 |
| 7 | 5 | 31 | Ryan Newman | Richard Childress Racing | Chevrolet | 60 | 4 |
| 8 | 8 | 42 | Kyle Larson | Chip Ganassi Racing | Chevrolet | 60 | 3 |
| 9 | 6 | 13 | Ty Dillon (R) | Germain Racing | Chevrolet | 60 | 2 |
| 10 | 16 | 38 | David Ragan | Front Row Motorsports | Ford | 60 | 1 |
| 11 | 15 | 95 | Michael McDowell | Leavine Family Racing | Chevrolet | 60 | 0 |
| 12 | 7 | 48 | Jimmie Johnson | Hendrick Motorsports | Chevrolet | 60 | 0 |
| 13 | 4 | 5 | Kasey Kahne | Hendrick Motorsports | Chevrolet | 60 | 0 |
| 14 | 19 | 96 | D. J. Kennington | Gaunt Brothers Racing | Toyota | 60 | 0 |
| 15 | 18 | 7 | Elliott Sadler (i) | Tommy Baldwin Racing | Chevrolet | 60 | 0 |
| 16 | 17 | 15 | Michael Waltrip | Premium Motorsports | Toyota | 60 | 0 |
| 17 | 20 | 33 | Jeffrey Earnhardt | Circle Sport – The Motorsports Group | Chevrolet | 60 | 0 |
| 18 | 10 | 77 | Erik Jones (R) | Furniture Row Racing | Toyota | 59 | 0 |
| 19 | 9 | 21 | Ryan Blaney | Wood Brothers Racing | Ford | 55 | 0 |
| 20 | 21 | 51 | Timmy Hill (i) | Rick Ware Racing | Chevrolet | 29 | 0 |
| 21 | 14 | 47 | A. J. Allmendinger | JTG Daugherty Racing | Chevrolet | 60 | 0 |
Official race results

=== Starting lineup ===
| Pos | No. | Driver | Team | Manufacturer | Notes |
|---|---|---|---|---|---|
| 1 | 24 | Chase Elliott | Hendrick Motorsports | Chevrolet | Fastest in pole qualifying |
| 2 | 88 | Dale Earnhardt Jr. | Hendrick Motorsports | Chevrolet | Second in pole qualifying |
| 3 | 1 | Jamie McMurray | Chip Ganassi Racing | Chevrolet | Second in Duel 1 |
| 4 | 11 | Denny Hamlin | Joe Gibbs Racing | Toyota | Duel race #2 winner |
| 5 | 4 | Kevin Harvick | Stewart–Haas Racing | Ford | Third in Duel 1 |
| 6 | 14 | Clint Bowyer | Stewart–Haas Racing | Ford | Second in Duel 2 |
| 7 | 2 | Brad Keselowski | Team Penske | Ford | Fourth in Duel 1 |
| 8 | 41 | Kurt Busch | Stewart–Haas Racing | Ford | Third in Duel 2 |
| 9 | 20 | Matt Kenseth | Joe Gibbs Racing | Toyota | Fifth in Duel 1 |
| 10 | 3 | Austin Dillon | Richard Childress Racing | Chevrolet | Fourth in Duel 2 |
| 11 | 6 | Trevor Bayne | Roush Fenway Racing | Ford | Sixth in Duel 1 |
| 12 | 10 | Danica Patrick | Stewart–Haas Racing | Ford | Sixth in Duel 2 |
| 13 | 43 | Aric Almirola | Richard Petty Motorsports | Ford | Seventh in Duel 1 |
| 14 | 31 | Ryan Newman | Richard Childress Racing | Chevrolet | Seventh in Duel 2 |
| 15 | 22 | Joey Logano | Team Penske | Ford | Eighth in Duel 1 |
| 16 | 42 | Kyle Larson | Chip Ganassi Racing | Chevrolet | Eighth in Duel 2 |
| 17 | 72 | Cole Whitt | TriStar Motorsports | Ford | Ninth in Duel 1 |
| 18 | 13 | Ty Dillon (R) | Germain Racing | Chevrolet | Ninth in Duel 2 |
| 19 | 19 | Daniel Suárez (R) | Joe Gibbs Racing | Toyota | 10th in Duel 1 |
| 20 | 38 | David Ragan | Front Row Motorsports | Ford | 10th in Duel 2 |
| 21 | 18 | Kyle Busch | Joe Gibbs Racing | Toyota | 11th in Duel 1 |
| 22 | 95 | Michael McDowell | Leavine Family Racing | Chevrolet | 11th in Duel 2 |
| 23 | 17 | Ricky Stenhouse Jr. | Roush Fenway Racing | Ford | 12th in Duel 1 |
| 24 | 48 | Jimmie Johnson (Note: Jimmie Johnson, Paul Menard and Ryan Blaney started from the rear of the field for switching to backup cars after their Duel races.) | Hendrick Motorsports | Chevrolet | 12th in Duel 2 |
| 25 | 32 | Matt DiBenedetto | Go Fas Racing | Ford | 13th in Duel 1 |
| 26 | 5 | Kasey Kahne | Hendrick Motorsports | Chevrolet | 13th in Duel 2 |
| 27 | 34 | Landon Cassill | Front Row Motorsports | Ford | 14th in Duel 1 |
| 28 | 96 | D. J. Kennington | Gaunt Brothers Racing | Toyota | 14th in Duel 2 |
| 29 | 23 | Joey Gase (i) | BK Racing | Toyota | 15th in Duel 1 |
| 30 | 15 | Michael Waltrip | Premium Motorsports | Toyota | 16th in Duel 2 |
| 31 | 83 | Corey LaJoie | BK Racing | Toyota | 16th in Duel 1 |
| 32 | 33 | Jeffrey Earnhardt | Circle Sport – The Motorsports Group | Chevrolet | 17th in Duel 2 |
| 33 | 27 | Paul Menard | Richard Childress Racing | Chevrolet | 18th in Duel 1 |
| 34 | 77 | Erik Jones (R) | Furniture Row Racing | Toyota | 18th in Duel 2 |
| 35 | 78 | Martin Truex Jr. (Note: Martin Truex Jr., A. J. Allmendinger and Chris Buescher started from the rear of the field after failing inspection after their Duel races.) | Furniture Row Racing | Toyota | 20th in Duel 1 |
| 36 | 21 | Ryan Blaney | Wood Brothers Racing | Ford | 19th in Duel 2 |
| 37 | 37 | Chris Buescher | JTG Daugherty Racing | Chevrolet | 21st in Duel 1 |
| 38 | 47 | A. J. Allmendinger | JTG Daugherty Racing | Chevrolet | 21st in Duel 2 |
| 39 | 75 | Brendan Gaughan (i) | Beard Motorsports | Chevrolet | Qualifying speed |
| 40 | 7 | Elliott Sadler (i) | Tommy Baldwin Racing | Chevrolet | Qualifying speed |
Did not qualify
| 41 | 51 | Timmy Hill (i) | Rick Ware Racing | Chevrolet | |
| 42 | 55 | Reed Sorenson | Premium Motorsports | Toyota | |
Official starting lineup

== Practice (post–Duels) ==
=== Second practice ===
David Ragan was the fastest in the second practice session with a time of 46.178 seconds and a speed of 194.898 mph (313.658 km/h).

| Pos | No. | Driver | Team | Manufacturer | Time | Speed |
|---|---|---|---|---|---|---|
| 1 | 38 | David Ragan | Front Row Motorsports | Ford | 46.178 | 194.898 |
| 2 | 5 | Kasey Kahne | Hendrick Motorsports | Chevrolet | 46.203 | 194.793 |
| 3 | 24 | Chase Elliott | Hendrick Motorsports | Chevrolet | 46.207 | 194.776 |
Official second practice results

=== Third practice ===
Kyle Busch was the fastest in the third practice session with a time of 45.624 seconds and a speed of 197.265 mph (317.467 km/h).

| Pos | No. | Driver | Team | Manufacturer | Time | Speed |
|---|---|---|---|---|---|---|
| 1 | 18 | Kyle Busch | Joe Gibbs Racing | Toyota | 45.624 | 197.265 |
| 2 | 20 | Matt Kenseth | Joe Gibbs Racing | Toyota | 45.626 | 197.256 |
| 3 | 11 | Denny Hamlin | Joe Gibbs Racing | Toyota | 45.660 | 197.109 |
Official third practice results

=== Final practice ===
Ricky Stenhouse Jr. was the fastest in the final practice session with a time of 45.351 seconds and a speed of 198.452 mph (319.378 km/h).

| Pos | No. | Driver | Team | Manufacturer | Time | Speed |
|---|---|---|---|---|---|---|
| 1 | 17 | Ricky Stenhouse Jr. | Roush Fenway Racing | Ford | 45.351 | 198.452 |
| 2 | 22 | Joey Logano | Team Penske | Ford | 45.743 | 196.751 |
| 3 | 2 | Brad Keselowski | Team Penske | Ford | 45.744 | 196.747 |
Official final practice results

== Race ==
=== Stage 1 ===
Chase Elliott led the field to the green flag at 2:40 p.m. He jumped ahead of teammate Dale Earnhardt Jr. to lead the first lap. Earnhardt was caught in the middle of the inside and outside lines with no draft help, also known as the "sucker hole", and fell back through the pack on the fourth lap. Jamie McMurray used the bottom line to take the lead on the eighth lap. Joey Logano made an unscheduled stop for a loose wheel on lap 14. A group of cars, all Toyota's, hit pit road on lap 17. Erik Jones overshot his pit box and Daniel Suárez was hit with a pass through penalty for speeding. Matt Kenseth came down pit road a second time for a loose wheel; a result of flat-spotting his tires on his first stop.

During the Toyota pit cycle, Kevin Harvick took the lead from McMurray on lap 18. The lapped car of Logano blocked his advanced and allowed Elliott to power by on the outside line on lap 23. The top line started losing steam, however, and Harvick took back the lead on lap 26. Another group of cars hit pit road on lap 31. Corey LaJoie mistimed his pit entry and aborted right before the entrance of pit road. When he did, he almost slammed into the rear of Clint Bowyer. Then, his car continued up the track, slammed the outside wall in the tri-oval and left debris up against the wall, bringing out the first caution of the race. Kurt Busch restarted the race from the tail end of the field for speeding on pit road.

The race restarted on lap 34. Kyle Busch lead the outside line charge past Harvick on the backstretch to take the lead on lap 43. Truex followed likewise the next lap, powering by Busch on the top line going into Turn 1 to take the lead. Busch took it back on lap 45. Ryan Blaney dove under him on the backstretch to take the lead on lap 49. David Ragan hit the wall on the frontstretch the following lap, but the race continued under green. Busch retook the lead on lap 52. Ricky Stenhouse Jr. cut down a tire in Turn 3, but the race remained green. Busch came to the line the leader at the conclusion of stage 1 and the second caution flew on lap 61 for the end of the stage. Harvick exited pit road first. Austin Dillon restarted the race from the tail end of the field for speeding.

=== Stage 2 ===
The race restarted on lap 68. For most of the second stage, the racing was more calm and collected. The outside line was the strongest line and the inside started dissipating by lap 78. The Toyota cars repeated their stage 1 move of short-pitting the segment on lap 81. Jimmie Johnson took the lead as a number of cars, mostly Ford's, came to pit road on lap 90. Earnhardt took the lead for the first time on lap 97.

Rounding Turn 3 on lap 105, Busch's car suffered either a left or right-rear tire blowout, then spun towards the wall and into Jones, Kenseth and Ty Dillon, causing a 6-car pileup. Race leader Earnhardt was clipped by Busch and slammed the wall. He said he didn't "know what happened there with the No. 18 (Busch) he just got turned around. I tried to get the wheel turned and get down the race track but I lifted off the gas to miss it, and got on the splitter a little bit and the car went straight. We jumped him, and got in the wall a little bit. Wasn't too hard of a hit. We thought we could get the car fixed, and get back out there and see what we could do with the rest of the day and make up some spots maybe. But, there is just too much damage. The radiator is pushed back. The toe is all messed up. The front suspension is knocked around pretty bad so the upper A-frame is laid over on the motor. We just can't drive it like that." He checked out of the infield care center with no health complications. Earnhardt, who missed 18 races last season due to a concussion, credited his new headrest for walking away without another one, saying "the (older) headrest, when you fly into the wall, it's like getting hit with a baseball bat. That car will take a few (G-forces) and if you have a lot of distance there, you can double the G's. We talked to NASCAR over the winter and they helped me understand how to better withstand those wrecks. We have (the headrest) tight on both sides." Busch took his frustration out on Goodyear. "Nothing that we did wrong," Busch said to FOX. "Obviously Goodyear tires just aren't very good at holding air. It's very frustrating when we have that every single year we've been here. Last year we had it as well too. It wrecked us in practice and tore up a car." Kenseth finished the race in 40th, his third career last-place finish. This brought out the third caution and cleanup necessitated a 17-minute red flag period. Elliott Sadler was the leader when the race resumed under caution, but surrendered the lead to Harvick when he hit pit road.

The race restarted on lap 113 and Harvick led all the way to the end of stage 2 as the fourth caution flew for the stage conclusion. All but the first eight cars opted to pit under the caution.

=== Stage 3 ===
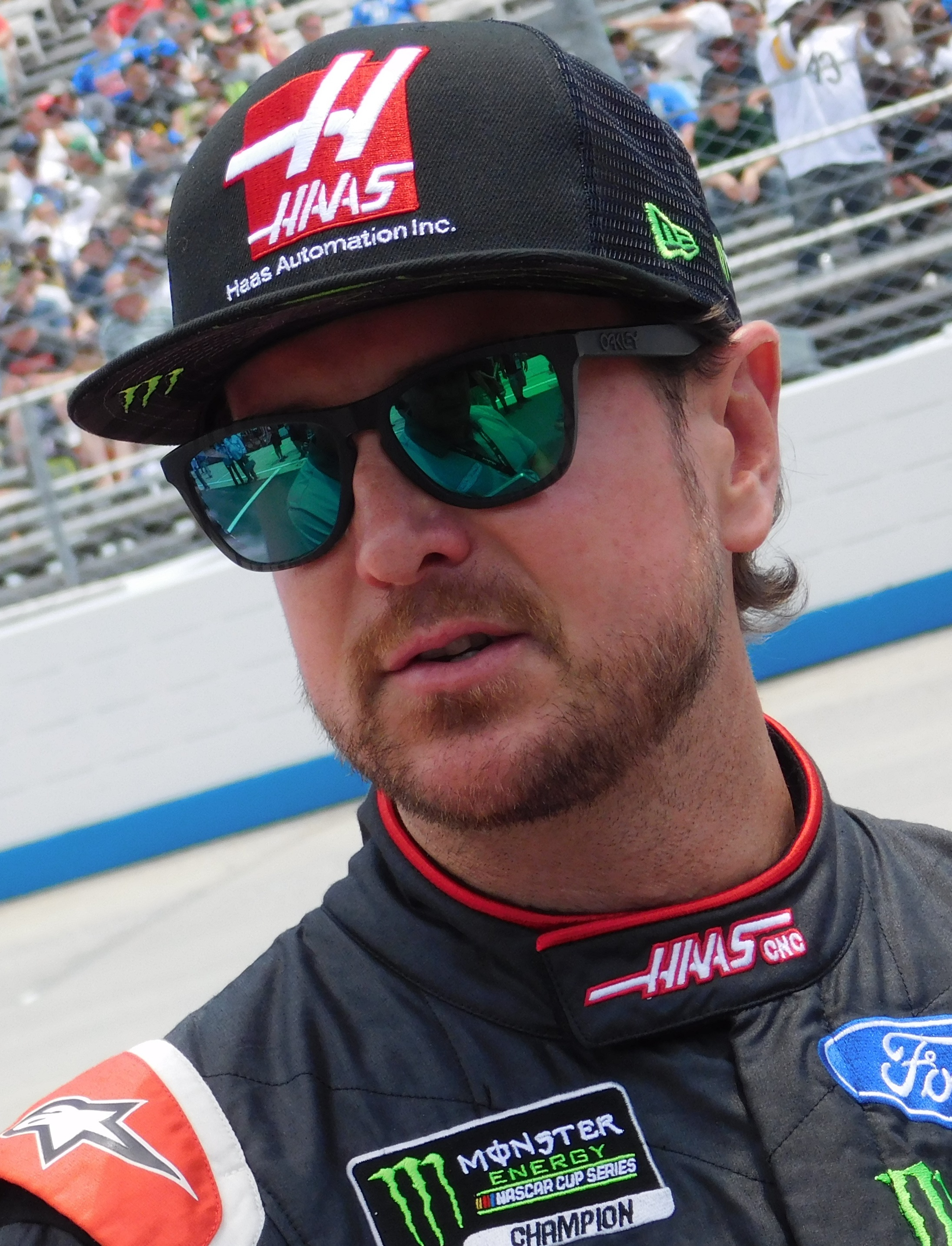
Kurt Busch won the race.

The race restarted on lap 125. Kyle Larson took the position for a brief moment, but Elliott powered by on the outside line and retook the lead on lap 126. Kasey Kahne on the inside line edged his teammate at the line to take the lead for the first time on lap 127. On the same lap, McMurray shoved Johnson down the backstretch when Johnson got loose, turned down into Trevor Bayne and pin-balled through the middle of the pack in Turn 3, collecting 14 cars. This brought out the fifth caution. Johnson said afterwards that the whole wreck was avoidable, "and it wasn't called for. From the minute I got off of Turn 2 on the entire back straightaway, I kept getting hit, and the rear tires are off the ground."

The race restarted with 67 laps to go. With 65 to go, Blaney signaled on the backstretch that he was coming to pit road this lap, believing he had a tire going down. Exiting Turn 4, he started decelerating to dive onto pit road when Sadler swerved up the track to avoid him. This clipped both Bayne and Stenhouse, sent them down the track and into the inside wall, bringing out the sixth caution. Kahne took the lead prior to the caution

The race restarted with 59 to go. Heading down the backstretch, McMurray, in the top line, tried passing to the inside of Elliott, but his advance was blocked. He checked up and got hooked into the outside wall by Brendan Gaughan. Suárez swerved to the left to avoid a t-bone collision with McMurray, only to collide with Ryan Newman. The accordion effect resulted in an 11-car wreck that brought out the seventh caution. "I haven't seen the replay yet," Keselowski said after being caught up in the wreck, "but everybody wrecked in front of me. We had just pitted and were running really good, right up at the front where we needed to be in contention for a solid finish and hopefully a win. ... That is unfortunate." Austin Dillon took the lead prior to the caution.

The race restarted with 52 to go. Logano took the lead with 51 to go. On the backstretch with 50 to go, Elliott shunted Joey Gase, which sent him into the outside wall and down the track, bringing out the eighth caution. Cole Whitt opted not to pit under the caution and assumed the lead.

The race restarted with 47 to go. Whitt lead the first lap after the restart, thanks to a push from Logano on the inside line, but Aric Almirola powered by Whitt on the outside to take the lead with 45 to go. Suddenly, Almirola slowed up and fell back, handing the lead to Larson with 43 to go. After battling side-by-side for a few laps, Logano took the lead with 37 to go. The top-five raced single-file with 31 to go. Kurt Busch led the outside line charge before Elliott took it over with 27 to go. The next lap, he cleared Logano for the race lead on the backstretch. With 20 to go, the bottom line disappeared and the top-12 cars formed a breakaway draft running up against the wall. Blaney broke out of line to lead the inside line's charge with 10 to go, but they made no progress and rejoined the top line with seven to go. With four to go, Elliott ran out of gas and Martin Truex Jr. took the lead in Turn 4. With two to go, the same fate befell Truex. Larson took command of the race with one lap to go. He also ran out of gas; Busch passed him exiting Turn 2 and won the 59th running of the Daytona 500.

== Post-race ==
=== Driver comments ===
"There is nothing predictable about this race anymore and the more years that have gone by that I didn't win I kept trying to go back to patterns that I had seen in the past," Busch said in victory lane. "My mirror fell off with 30 laps to go and I couldn't even see out the back. And I thought that was an omen. Throw caution to the wind. The more unpredictability that keeps unfolding at the Daytona 500, I predicted it. It just got crazy and wild and I am so proud of all the drivers at the end. We put on a show for a full fuel run and nobody took each other out and it was one of the smartest chess games I have seen out there. All the hard work that Ford and SHR put into this -- this Ford Fusion is in Daytona's victory lane." Team owner Tony Stewart, who failed to win the Daytona 500 in 17 attempts, said if he knew he "would retire and win the next race, I would have retired 17 years ago and got it that way. It's a pretty cool deal. This is one that we've waited for, for a long, long time."

Blaney, who scored a career-best finish of runner-up despite running out of gas on the final lap, said he "tried to make a move with 10 to go and I didn't go anywhere. I thought we were kind of stuck. Luckily, we had the 22 with us. I kind of helped him and he kind of helped me. Late there we got a big run into (Turn) 1 and we kind of all separated and I got a big pull. I got to second behind the 41 somehow and that kept us going the whole way. I laid back to the 47 thinking I'd get a good run and I was sputtering and running out of gas on the backstretch."

Michael Waltrip, who finished eighth – and was the highest finishing Toyota driver – in his final career NASCAR start, said this race will "be a great memory! I felt like so many times, I was in the middle of a crash and I missed it. You do a good job and get lucky. At the end, I just lost the draft, and that's unfortunate because I was able to weave my way past people. I had a really good-handling car."

== Race results ==
=== Stage Results ===
Stage 1 Laps: 60

| Pos | No | Driver | Team | Manufacturer | Points |
|---|---|---|---|---|---|
| 1 | 18 | Kyle Busch | Joe Gibbs Racing | Toyota | 10 |
| 2 | 4 | Kevin Harvick | Stewart–Haas Racing | Ford | 9 |
| 3 | 21 | Ryan Blaney | Wood Brothers Racing | Ford | 8 |
| 4 | 2 | Brad Keselowski | Team Penske | Ford | 7 |
| 5 | 88 | Dale Earnhardt Jr. | Hendrick Motorsports | Chevrolet | 6 |
| 6 | 42 | Kyle Larson | Chip Ganassi Racing | Chevrolet | 5 |
| 7 | 1 | Jamie McMurray | Chip Ganassi Racing | Chevrolet | 4 |
| 8 | 11 | Denny Hamlin | Joe Gibbs Racing | Toyota | 3 |
| 9 | 48 | Jimmie Johnson | Hendrick Motorsports | Chevrolet | 2 |
| 10 | 10 | Danica Patrick | Stewart–Haas Racing | Ford | 1 |
Official stage one results

Stage 2 Laps: 60

| Pos | No | Driver | Team | Manufacturer | Points |
|---|---|---|---|---|---|
| 1 | 4 | Kevin Harvick | Stewart–Haas Racing | Ford | 10 |
| 2 | 22 | Joey Logano | Team Penske | Ford | 9 |
| 3 | 41 | Kurt Busch | Stewart–Haas Racing | Ford | 8 |
| 4 | 2 | Brad Keselowski | Team Penske | Ford | 7 |
| 5 | 10 | Danica Patrick | Stewart–Haas Racing | Ford | 6 |
| 6 | 47 | A. J. Allmendinger | JTG Daugherty Racing | Chevrolet | 5 |
| 7 | 14 | Clint Bowyer | Stewart–Haas Racing | Ford | 4 |
| 8 | 42 | Kyle Larson | Chip Ganassi Racing | Chevrolet | 3 |
| 9 | 31 | Ryan Newman | Richard Childress Racing | Chevrolet | 2 |
| 10 | 21 | Ryan Blaney | Wood Brothers Racing | Ford | 1 |
Official stage two results

=== Final Stage Results ===
Stage 3 Laps: 80

| Pos | Grid | No | Driver | Team | Manufacturer | Laps | Points |
|---|---|---|---|---|---|---|---|
| 1 | 8 | 41 | Kurt Busch | Stewart–Haas Racing | Ford | 200 | 48 |
| 2 | 36 | 21 | Ryan Blaney | Wood Brothers Racing | Ford | 200 | 44 |
| 3 | 38 | 47 | A. J. Allmendinger | JTG Daugherty Racing | Chevrolet | 200 | 39 |
| 4 | 13 | 43 | Aric Almirola | Richard Petty Motorsports | Ford | 200 | 33 |
| 5 | 33 | 27 | Paul Menard | Richard Childress Racing | Chevrolet | 200 | 32 |
| 6 | 15 | 22 | Joey Logano | Team Penske | Ford | 200 | 40 |
| 7 | 26 | 5 | Kasey Kahne | Hendrick Motorsports | Chevrolet | 200 | 30 |
| 8 | 30 | 15 | Michael Waltrip | Premium Motorsports | Toyota | 200 | 29 |
| 9 | 25 | 32 | Matt DiBenedetto | Go Fas Racing | Ford | 200 | 28 |
| 10 | 11 | 6 | Trevor Bayne | Roush Fenway Racing | Ford | 200 | 27 |
| 11 | 39 | 75 | Brendan Gaughan (i) | Beard Motorsports | Chevrolet | 200 | 0 |
| 12 | 16 | 42 | Kyle Larson | Chip Ganassi Racing | Chevrolet | 200 | 33 |
| 13 | 35 | 78 | Martin Truex Jr. | Furniture Row Racing | Toyota | 200 | 24 |
| 14 | 1 | 24 | Chase Elliott | Hendrick Motorsports | Chevrolet | 200 | 23 |
| 15 | 22 | 95 | Michael McDowell | Leavine Family Racing | Chevrolet | 200 | 22 |
| 16 | 27 | 34 | Landon Cassill | Front Row Motorsports | Ford | 199 | 21 |
| 17 | 4 | 11 | Denny Hamlin | Joe Gibbs Racing | Toyota | 199 | 23 |
| 18 | 17 | 72 | Cole Whitt | TriStar Motorsports | Ford | 199 | 19 |
| 19 | 10 | 3 | Austin Dillon | Richard Childress Racing | Chevrolet | 199 | 18 |
| 20 | 40 | 7 | Elliott Sadler (i) | Tommy Baldwin Racing | Chevrolet | 199 | 0 |
| 21 | 14 | 31 | Ryan Newman | Richard Childress Racing | Chevrolet | 198 | 18 |
| 22 | 5 | 4 | Kevin Harvick | Stewart–Haas Racing | Ford | 197 | 34 |
| 23 | 29 | 23 | Joey Gase (i) | BK Racing | Toyota | 196 | 0 |
| 24 | 31 | 83 | Corey LaJoie (R) | BK Racing | Toyota | 193 | 13 |
| 25 | 20 | 38 | David Ragan | Front Row Motorsports | Ford | 188 | 12 |
| 26 | 32 | 33 | Jeffrey Earnhardt | Circle Sport – The Motorsports Group | Chevrolet | 145 | 11 |
| 27 | 7 | 2 | Brad Keselowski | Team Penske | Ford | 143 | 24 |
| 28 | 3 | 1 | Jamie McMurray | Chip Ganassi Racing | Chevrolet | 141 | 13 |
| 29 | 19 | 19 | Daniel Suárez (R) | Joe Gibbs Racing | Toyota | 141 | 8 |
| 30 | 18 | 13 | Ty Dillon (R) | Germain Racing | Chevrolet | 140 | 7 |
| 31 | 23 | 17 | Ricky Stenhouse Jr. | Roush Fenway Racing | Ford | 133 | 6 |
| 32 | 6 | 14 | Clint Bowyer | Stewart–Haas Racing | Ford | 128 | 9 |
| 33 | 12 | 10 | Danica Patrick | Stewart–Haas Racing | Ford | 128 | 11 |
| 34 | 24 | 48 | Jimmie Johnson | Hendrick Motorsports | Chevrolet | 127 | 5 |
| 35 | 37 | 37 | Chris Buescher | JTG Daugherty Racing | Chevrolet | 127 | 2 |
| 36 | 28 | 96 | D. J. Kennington | Gaunt Brothers Racing | Toyota | 127 | 1 |
| 37 | 2 | 88 | Dale Earnhardt Jr. | Hendrick Motorsports | Chevrolet | 106 | 7 |
| 38 | 21 | 18 | Kyle Busch | Joe Gibbs Racing | Toyota | 103 | 11 |
| 39 | 34 | 77 | Erik Jones (R) | Furniture Row Racing | Toyota | 103 | 1 |
| 40 | 9 | 20 | Matt Kenseth | Joe Gibbs Racing | Toyota | 103 | 1 |
Official race results

=== Race statistics ===
- Lead changes: 37 among 18 different drivers
- Cautions/Laps: 8 for 40
- Red flags: 1 for 17 minutes
- Time of race: 3 hours, 29 minutes and 31 seconds
- Average speed: 143.187 miles per hour (230.437 km/h)

== Media ==
=== Television ===
Since 2001—with the exception of 2002, 2004 and 2006—the Daytona 500 has been carried by Fox in the United States. The booth crew consisted of longtime NASCAR lap-by-lap announcer Mike Joy, three–time Daytona 500 champion Jeff Gordon, and 1989 race winner Darrell Waltrip. Pit road was manned by Jamie Little, Chris Neville, Vince Welch and Matt Yocum.

Fox Television
| Booth announcers | Pit reporters |
|---|---|
| Lap-by-lap: Mike Joy; Color-commentator: Jeff Gordon; Color commentator: Darrell Waltrip | Jamie Little; Chris Neville; Vince Welch; Matt Yocum |

=== Radio ===
The race was broadcast on radio by the Motor Racing Network—who has covered the Daytona 500 since 1970—and simulcast on Sirius XM NASCAR Radio. The booth crew consisted of longtime announcer Joe Moore, Jeff Striegle and 1989 Cup Series champion Rusty Wallace. Longtime turn announcer – and prodigy of MRN co-founder Ken Squier – Dave Moody was the lead turn announcer. He called the Daytona 500 from atop the Sunoco tower outside the exit of turn 2 when the field was racing through turns 1 and 2. Mike Bagley worked the backstretch for the Daytona 500 from a spotter's stand on the inside of the track. Kyle Rickey called the Daytona 500 when the field was racing through turns 3 and 4 from the Sunoco tower outside the exit of turn 4. On pit road, MRN was manned by lead pit reporter and NASCAR Hall of Fame Executive Director Winston Kelley. He was joined on pit road by Steve Post and Alex Hayden.

MRN Radio
| Booth announcers | Turn announcers | Pit reporters |
|---|---|---|
| Lead announcer: Joe Moore; Announcer: Jeff Striegle; Announcer: Rusty Wallace | Turns 1 & 2: Dave Moody; Backstretch: Mike Bagley; Turns 3 & 4: Kyle Rickey | Alex Hayden; Winston Kelley; Steve Post |

== Standings after the race ==
Drivers' Championship standings

Table shows the first 16 positions of the driver standings.

| Pos | Driver | Points |
|---|---|---|
| 1 | Kurt Busch | 56 |
| 2 | Ryan Blaney | 44 (–12) |
| 3 | Joey Logano | 43 (–13) |
| 4 | Kevin Harvick | 42 (–14) |
| 5 | A. J. Allmendinger | 39 (–17) |
| 6 | Aric Almirola | 37 (–19) |
| 7 | Kyle Larson | 36 (–20) |
| 8 | Chase Elliott | 33 (–23) |
| 9 | Denny Hamlin | 33 (–23) |
| 10 | Paul Menard | 32 (–24) |
| 11 | Trevor Bayne | 32 (–24) |
| 12 | Brad Keselowski | 31 (–25) |
| 13 | Kasey Kahne | 30 (–26) |
| 14 | Michael Waltrip | 29 (–27) |
| 15 | Matt DiBenedetto | 28 (–28) |
| 16 | Austin Dillon | 25 (–31) |
Official driver's standings

Manufacturers' Championship standings

| Pos | Manufacturer | Points |
|---|---|---|
| 1 | Ford | 40 |
| 2 | Chevrolet | 34 (–6) |
| 3 | Toyota | 29 (–11) |
Official manufacturers' standings

== Notes ==
| Previous race: 2016 Ford EcoBoost 400 | Monster Energy NASCAR Cup Series; 2017 season | Next race: 2017 Folds of Honor QuikTrip 500 |
