= Gwaltney =

Gwaltney is a surname. Notable people with the surname include:

- Francis Irby Gwaltney (1921–1981) American author
- John Langston Gwaltney (1928–1998), African-American writer and anthropologist
- Sheila Gwaltney (born 1954), American diplomat
- Tommy Gwaltney (1921–2003), American jazz musician

== See also ==
- Gwaltney Foods, a brand of Smithfield Foods
