= Fraiburgo =

- Municipality
- The Municipality of Fraiburgo
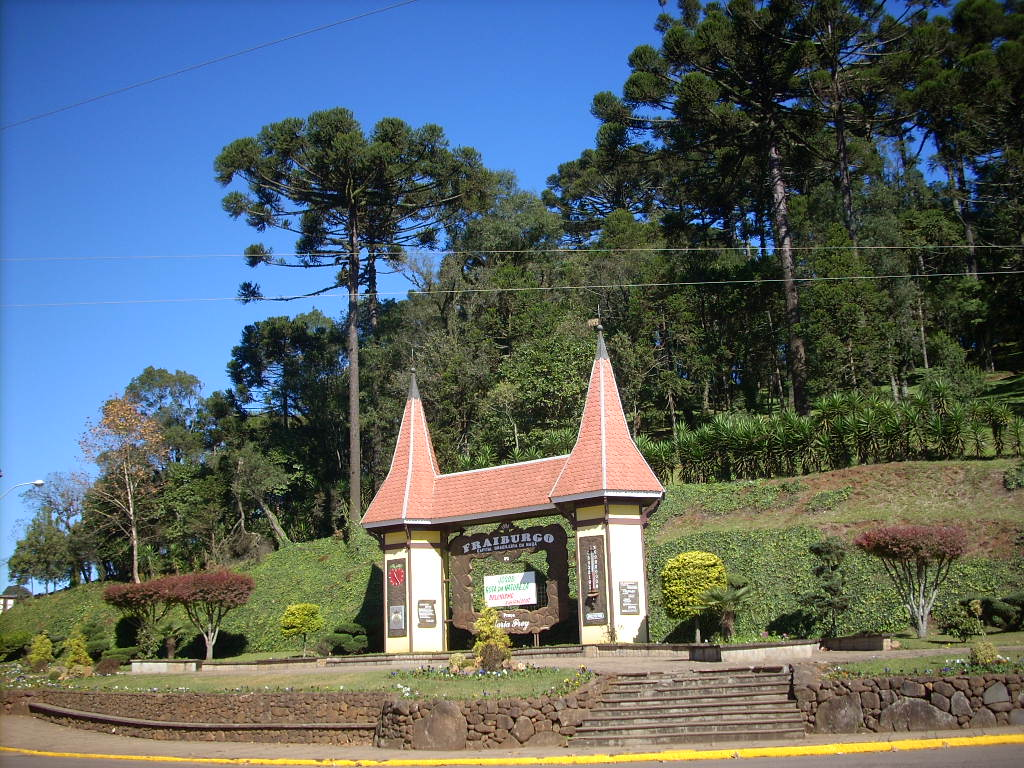
- View of Maria Frey Square, downtown Fraiburgo.

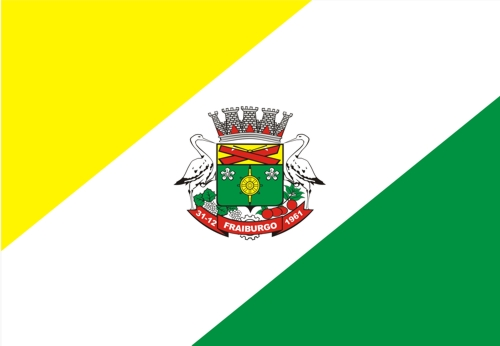
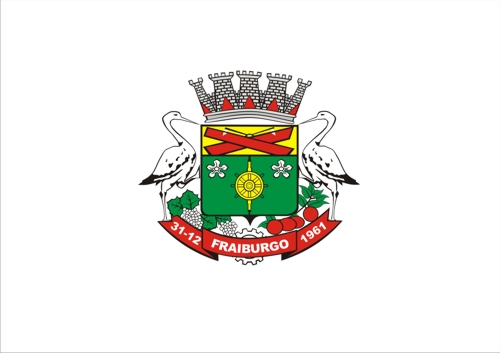
- Flag Coat of arms
- Nickname: Frai
- Location in the State of Santa Catarina

- Coordinates: 27°01′33″S 50°55′15″W
- Country: Brazil
- Region: South
- State: Santa Catarina
- Founded: December 19, 1961

Government
  - Mayor: Wilson Cardoso Ribeiro

Area
  - Municipality: 547,854 km^{2} (211,528 sq mi)
- Elevation: 1,048 m (3,438 ft)

Population (2020)
  - Municipality: 36,584
  - Density: 938.9/km^{2} (2,432/sq mi)
  - Urban: 30,914
  - Rural: 5,977
- Time zone: UTC-3 (UTC-3)
  - Summer (DST): UTC-2 (UTC-2)
- HDI (2000): 0.779 – high
- Website: www.fraiburgo.sc.gov.br

Fraiburgo (nicknamed Frai) is a Brazilian municipality located in the countryside of the Santa Catarina state. The city is strongly influenced by European immigrants, especially Germans and Italians. However, other nationalities also contributed to the formation of the city's character in terms of e.g.: architecture, gastronomy, religion and economy, amongst other factors. Its multiculturality is a remarkable characteristic not exclusively attributed to Fraiburgo but many other Southern Brazilian municipalities.

The city is famous in Brazil for the large production of apples which its plantation is favored by the low temperatures in the winter season in the Southern Hemisphere that takes place in July, August and September. Depending on the period of the year tourists can experience first-hand the whole apple production cycle as well other products made from apple such as: cider, juices, snacks and so forth.

== Economy ==
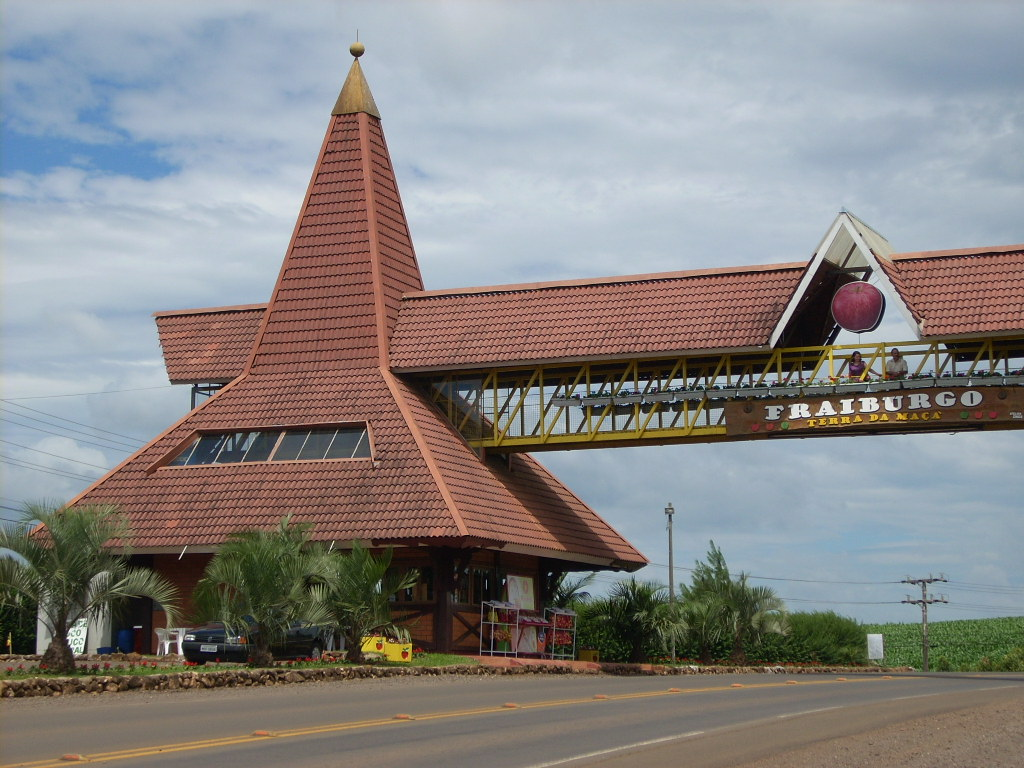
City Gateway

In the early stages the economy of Fraiburgo's region was based on sawmills. The former dense forests consisted mostly in Brazilian walnuts, Cedars, Cinnamons, Yerba maté, and the exuberant Brazilian Pines. These forests still represent the typical Southern Brazilian landscape in spite of ruthless deforestation in the past decades. A significant turnover in the economy took place due to the shortage of wood, implementation of Brazilian environmental laws and environmental consciousness. As a result, agriculture became the predominant source of wealth alongside the production of paper, cellulose, and furniture derived from extensive reforestation areas. The reforestation projects introduced the Pinus elliottii to the region.

=== Agriculture ===
Apples are the base of Fraiburgo economy, being responsible for 60% of the total state production and 40% of the national production. The city also produces honey in large quantities; there are about 15,000 honeycombs to pollinate 7 million apple trees. Moreover, there are familiar farms that produce corn, beans, garlic, onions, and peaches.

=== Tourism ===
Rural tourism, tourism of adventure, gastronomy.

== Climate ==
Fraiburgo has Seasoned climate: relatively hot dry summers (November to March) with temperatures reaching up to 35 degrees Celsius (95 degrees Fahrenheit) on the hottest days; winters (June to August) cold mornings, typical maximum daily temperatures of 15 degrees Celsius (59 degrees Fahrenheit), and minimums of a few degrees above freezing. The year average temperature 16,1 °C (60.8F) Occasional snowfall occurs in suburbs at higher altitudes, and may extend throughout the city, though this happens infrequently (about every 8–10 years).

Climate data for Fraiburgo, elevation 1,145 m (3,757 ft), (1976–2005)
Month	Jan	Feb	Mar	Apr	May	Jun	Jul	Aug	Sep	Oct	Nov	Dec	Year
Record high °C (°F)	36.5 (97.7)	31.8 (89.2)	31.7 (89.1)	29.8 (85.6)	29.0 (84.2)	25.5 (77.9)	28.0 (82.4)	27.6 (81.7)	30.2 (86.4)	31.4 (88.5)	35.2 (95.4)	32.4 (90.3)	36.5 (97.7)
Mean daily maximum °C (°F)	26.4 (79.5)	26.6 (79.9)	24.7 (76.5)	22.1 (71.8)	19.8 (67.6)	18.4 (65.1)	18.4 (65.1)	19.0 (66.2)	20.8 (69.4)	22.3 (72.1)	23.9 (75.0)	25.2 (77.4)	22.3 (72.1)
Daily mean °C (°F)	19.6 (67.3)	19.9 (67.8)	18.3 (64.9)	15.3 (59.5)	12.7 (54.9)	10.9 (51.6)	11.5 (52.7)	12.8 (55.0)	13.2 (55.8)	15.5 (59.9)	17.3 (63.1)	18.9 (66.0)	15.5 (59.9)
Mean daily minimum °C (°F)	15.0 (59.0)	15.7 (60.3)	14.1 (57.4)	10.6 (51.1)	8.0 (46.4)	6.2 (43.2)	6.4 (43.5)	8.0 (46.4)	8.5 (47.3)	10.9 (51.6)	12.5 (54.5)	14.1 (57.4)	10.8 (51.5)
Record low °C (°F)	3.5 (38.3)	7.6 (45.7)	4.6 (40.3)	−2.5 (27.5)	−3.5 (25.7)	−7.2 (19.0)	−5.8 (21.6)	−5.3 (22.5)	−5.0 (23.0)	−1.5 (29.3)	−2.5 (27.5)	2.7 (36.9)	−7.2 (19.0)
Average precipitation mm (inches)	193.0 (7.60)	170.0 (6.69)	125.0 (4.92)	98.0 (3.86)	119.0 (4.69)	122.0 (4.80)	105.0 (4.13)	96.0 (3.78)	166.0 (6.54)	189.0 (7.44)	138.0 (5.43)	163.0 (6.42)	1,684 (66.3)
Average relative humidity (%)	83	84	85	84	79	82	80	82	82	82	79	82	82
Mean monthly sunshine hours	197	179	194	176	180	160	169	162	153	176	177	188	2,111
Source 1: Empresa Brasileira de Pesquisa Agropecuária (EMBRAPA)
Source 2: Climatempo (precipitation)

== Geography ==
Its geographical position is 27°01′34″S 50°55′17″W, and its height is approximately 1048 meters above sea level. Currently, its population is around 36,584 according to IBGE estimate. However, this figure fluctuates with the guest workers (10000) throughout the apple harvest season (From January to April).

== Symbols ==
=== Flag ===
The municipal flag was instituted by Law nº 303 of 05/09/1977. It was designed by the educators Rui Batagelo and Francisco Costella supported by the professor and vexillologist Antônio Peixoto de Faria. The flag has the colors green, white and yellow. In the center there is the coat of the arms of Fraiburgo (2nd version), representing the municipal government. The green color represents the fields and the harvests. The white color symbolizes the peace, friendship, work, prosperity, pureness, faith. The yellow color represents the industries of the city, generators of wealth

=== Coat of arms ===
The coat of arms was created in 1964 in Paris by heraldist Robert Louis on commission of Albert Mahler, an early German-ascent local, and later changed. It refers to Fraiburgo's woods and timber industry (logs and flowers) and St. Catherine's martyrdom tools, for the State's namesake, and includes also storks as supporters standing for Alsatia, whence come the first settlers; cogwheel and apples symbolize Fraiburgo's recent industries.

== Neighbour cities ==
- Lebon Régis
- Curitibanos
- Frei Rogério
- Monte Carlo
- Tangará
- Videira
- Rio das Antas
- Caçador
