= Friberg =

Friberg is a Swedish surname. Notable people with the surname include:

- Adam Friberg (born 1991), Swedish Pro Gamer, known for Ninjas In Pyjamas
- Alexandra Friberg, Swedish model and beauty pageant titleholder
- Arnold Friberg (1913–2010), American artist, noted for his religious work
- Bernie Friberg (1899–1958), baseball player
- Bror Friberg (1839–1878), New Zealand immigration agent
- Conrad Friberg (1896–1989), American filmmaker and labor organizer
- Daniel Friberg (born 1978), Swedish businessman, publisher, and writer
- Eino Friberg (1901–1995), Finnish-American writer
- Erik Friberg, multiple people
- Felix Friberg (born 2005), Finnish professional football player
- Gunnar Friberg, Swedish bandy player
- Karl Friberg (born 1999), Swedish tennis player
- Louise Friberg, multiple people
- Maikki Friberg (1861–1927), Finnish educator, journal editor, suffragist and peace activist
- Maria Friberg (born 1966), Swedish artist
- Max Friberg (born 1992), Swedish ice hockey player
- Ralf Friberg (1936–2026), Finnish journalist, diplomat and politician
- Richard Friberg (born 1967), Swedish economist
- Sven Friberg (1895–1964), Swedish footballer and manager
- Ulf Friberg (born 1962), Swedish actor and film director
- Wilhelm Friberg (1865–1932), Swedish football manager

== See also ==
- Freiberg (disambiguation)
- Freiburg (disambiguation)
- Freyberg
- Freyburg (disambiguation)
- Friberg Township, Minnesota
- Fribourg (disambiguation)
