= Freistadt (disambiguation) =

Freistadt is a town in Upper Austria.

Freistadt may also refer to:

- Freistadt, Wisconsin, a community in Wisconsin, USA
- Free City of Danzig (Freie Stadt Danzig), Poland
- Fryštát, a town in the Czech Republic (German: Freistadt)
- Frysztak, Poland (German: Freistadt)
- Hlohovec, town in Slovakia (Freistadt an der Waag)

== See also ==
- Freistatt
- Freystadt
- Freistaat
- Freiburg (disambiguation)
- Freiberg (disambiguation)
