= Fryburg =

Fryburg may refer to:

- Fryburg, North Dakota, an unincorporated community in Billings County
- Fryburg, Ohio, an unincorporated community in Auglaize County
- Fryburg, Pennsylvania, an unincorporated community in Clarion County
- Vryburg, a town in the North West province, South Africa, and pronounced as Fryburg in English

== See also ==
- Fryeburg (disambiguation)
- Freyburg (disambiguation)
