= Fribourg (surname) =

Fribourg is a Belgian surname. Notable people with the surname include:

- Eugenie Fribourg (1908–2007), American physician
- Michel Fribourg (1913–2001), Belgian-born American billionaire
- Paul J. Fribourg (born 1954/55), American businessman, chairman, and CEO of ContiGroup Companies
