= Wayne Farms =

American poultry producer and processor

Wayne Farms LLC
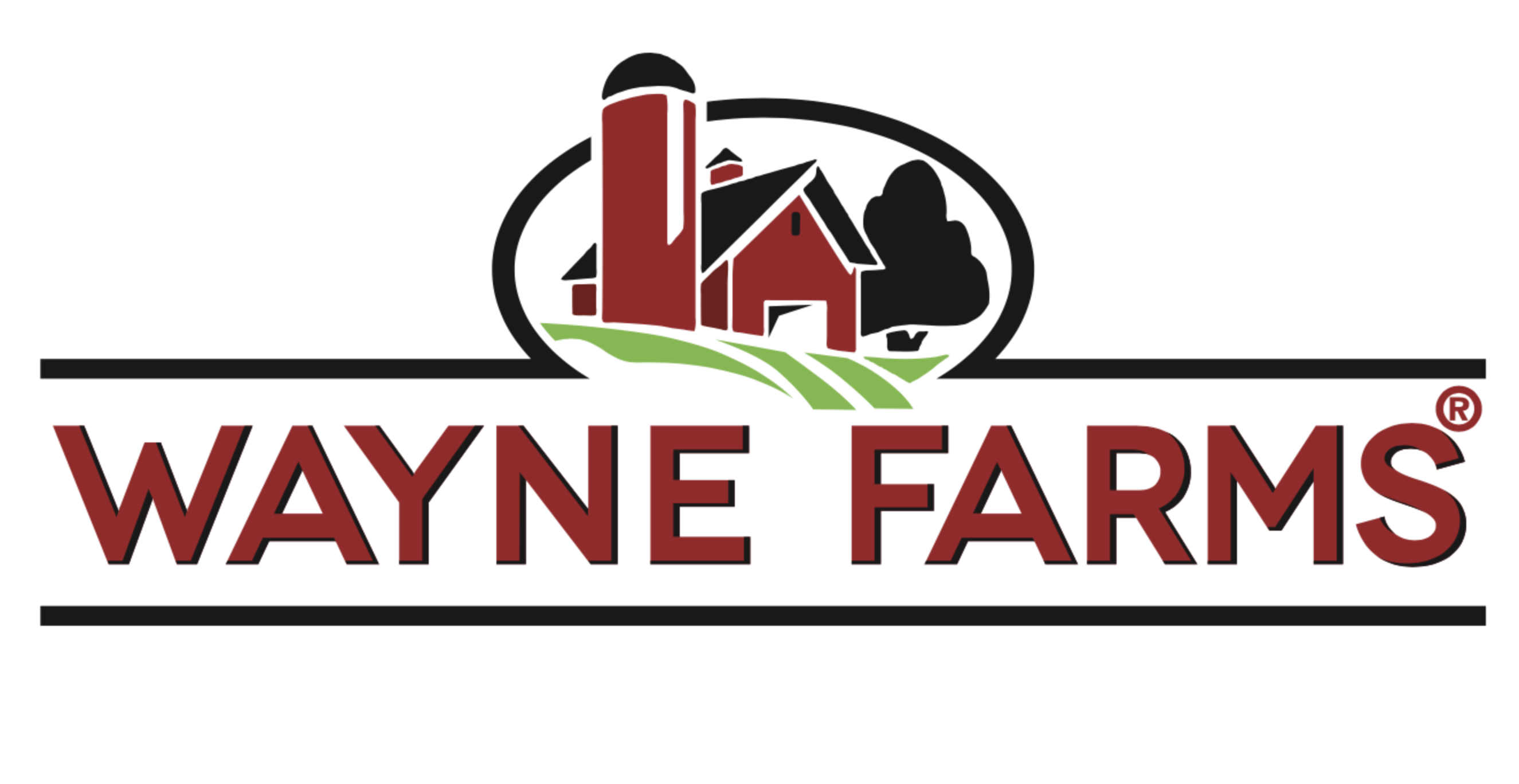
- Company type: Subsidiary
- Industry: Agribusiness, agriculture, food industry
- Founded: 1965; 61 years ago
- Headquarters: Danville, Arkansas
- Key people: Clint Rivers, President and CEO; Courtney Fazekas, CFO
- Products: Poultry
- Revenue: ▲US$1.5 billion (FY 2004)
- Number of employees: 9800
- Parent: ContiGroup Companies (1965-2022); Wayne-Sanderson Farms (2022-present)
- Website: www.waynefarms.com

Wayne Farms LLC is an American producer and processor of poultry based in Oakwood, Georgia.

As a subsidiary of ContiGroup, Wayne Farms operates hatcheries, feed mills, finishing farms, and processing facilities to supply poultry to retail and foodservice customers worldwide. Its 13 processing facilities span the southeast region of the United States with its corporate headquarters located in Oakwood, Georgia. Wayne Farms LLC sells fresh, frozen, boneless, and fully cooked poultry to retail and foodservice customers worldwide under the brands of Wayne Farms and Platinum Harvest.

On July 22, 2022, Wayne Farms merged with Sanderson Farms to form Wayne-Sanderson Farms. The new company is controlled by a joint venture between Cargill and Conti (also known as Continental Grain Co. or ContiGroup).

== History ==
The history of the company goes back to 1895 and was known for feed milling.

In 1916, D.W. McMillen started manufacturing a feed by the name of 'Wayne' which was later chosen as a name for the company.

In 1965, Allied Mills spun-out its poultry business in order to focus on manufacturing and named the new company, Wayne Farms. The decision was taken in the light of recent acquisition of 51 percent shares by Continental Grain Co.

Wayne Farms operated in Albertville and Union Springs, Alabama. Eventually, the company acquired processing plants in Danville, Arkansas; Laurel, Mississippi; Decatur, Alabama; Dobson, North Carolina; Pendergrass, Georgia; Enterprise, Alabama; College Park, Georgia and Dothan, Alabama.

The Dutch Quality House brand was created in 1978, and acquired by the company in 1985 through the purchase of a processing plant in Oakwood, Georgia. Additionally, the company purchased plants in Bossier City, Louisiana and Douglas, Georgia and built two new plants in Decatur, Alabama. The company later sold the Bossier City location in October 2005. The Dutch Quality House brand name was retired in 2017.

In September 2021, it was announced that Sanderson Farms and Wayne Farms will be merged into one company. In July 2022, they merged to form Wayne-Sanderson Farms.

== See also ==
- Impact of the COVID-19 pandemic on the meat industry in the United States
