= Fryeburg =

Fryeburg can refer to:

- Fryeburg, Louisiana, an unincorporated community, United States
- Fryeburg, Maine, a town, United States
- Fryeburg (CDP), Maine, a census-designated place, United States

== See also ==
- Fryburg (disambiguation)
- Freyburg (disambiguation)
