= ContiGroup Companies =

Grain trading company

ContiGroup Companies, Inc
- Company type: Private company
- Industry: Agribusiness, agriculture, food industry
- Founded: 1813; 213 years ago
- Headquarters: 767 Fifth Avenue; New York, NY; United States (Corporate)
- Key people: Paul J. Fribourg, Chairman, President; Michael J Zimmerman, CFO; Joseph Massa Jr, COO
- Products: Poultry, pork, beef, investment
- Revenue: ▲$14.1 billion US$ (FY 2011)
- Number of employees: ~13,500
- Website: ContiGroup Companies, Inc.

ContiGroup Companies, Inc (CGC) was founded by Simon Fribourg in Arlon, Belgium, in 1813 as a grain-trading firm. Formerly known as Continental Grain, ContiGroup has expanded into a multinational corporation with offices and facilities in 10 countries while employing more than 13,500 people worldwide. Today, CGC is one of the largest privately held corporations in the United States.

== History ==
- 1813: The Company is founded by Simon Fribourg in Arlon, Belgium.
- 1890–1899: The Company expands into flour milling and builds its first mill in Arlon.
- 1914–1917: Offices moved to London due to the outbreak of World War I.
- 1919: Operations resume in Antwerp under the name ‘Compagnie Continentale d'Importation’. The CCI is managed by brothers Jules Fribourg et René Fribourg.
- 1921: Expanded operations to the United States by establishing ‘Continental Grain’ in Chicago and then in New York.
- 1928: Continental Grain buys a grain elevator in St. Louis, Missouri. This would be the first of seven it would hold by 1935.
- 1940: The Fribourg family leaves Europe to settle in the United States. This was due to the outbreak of World War II.
- 1944: The Company moves its headquarters from Paris to New York and the first CEO (Michel Fribourg) is elected.
- 1964: Continental Grain makes the first major grain sale by any US company to the Soviet Union. The deal called for the sale of one million tons of wheat to Exportkhleb, a soviet grain-purchasing agency.
- 1965: Continental Grain ventures into the poultry business with its purchase of a majority interest in Allied Mills. This new division includes livestock production operations as well as processing operations.
- 1970: Operations at Allied Mills poultry division is expanded to include seven poultry processing facilities, as well as three egg production and processing units.
- 1971: Continental Grain acquired Oroweat, a baking company
- 1972: Another major sale to the Soviet Union is finalized and 10 million tons of grain is sent overseas.
- 1974: Continental Grain expands its ownership of Allied Mills and makes it a wholly owned subsidiary.
- 1975: Coronado Feeders is acquired by the company and establishes its first business venture into cattle feeding.
- 1978: Another cattle feeding business, XIT Feeders, is acquired by Continental Grain.
- 1978: A plant in Dobson, North Carolina is acquired by the Poultry Division of Continental Grain.
- 1979: Colorado Beef is acquired, further expanding the company's cattle feeding business.
- 1979: In a joint venture with Charoen Pokphand, Continental Grain opens the first foreign-owned feed mill in Chinese history. The new venture is called Conti Chia Tai International (CCTI).
- 1981: Grant County Feeders is acquired into the company's cattle feeding business.
- 1981: Oroweat acquired Brownberry
- 1984: Oroweat is sold to General Foods; Brownberry is sold to Clayton, Dubilier & Rice
- 1998: Continental Grain ventures into the pork business with its purchase of a majority interest in Premium Standard Farms, Inc.
- 1999: Continental Grain changes its name to ContiGroup Companies, Inc, after the sale of the company's commodity marketing business to Cargill.
- 2000: The Animal Nutrition Division is sold to Hubbard Feeds of Mankato, Minnesota.
- 2000: ContiFinancial, an early originator of subprime loans, went bankrupt; ContiGroup was the major shareholder.
- 2002: Wayne Farms purchases its thirteenth processing facility at College Park, Georgia.
- 2004: Wayne Farms begins building a new further-processing facility in Decatur, Alabama.
- 2013: Wayne Farms purchases a processing facility in Dothan, Alabama.

== ContiGroup businesses ==
Headquartered in New York, NY, ContiGroup has offices and facilities in 10 countries while employing more than 13,500 people worldwide. CGC's businesses include ventures into poultry, pork, beef, animal feed, aquaculture, and flour milling. Additionally, CGC also provides investment services in securities, real estate, and private equity through its ContiInvestment business unit.

=== Wayne Farms ===
Formerly known as the Poultry Division of ContiGroup Companies, Wayne Farms LLC is the sixth-largest vertically integrated producer and processor of poultry in the United States. Since its spin-off in 1965, Wayne Farms has grown its processing capacity to 250 million chickens annually. Its 13 processing facilities span the southeast region of the United States with its corporate headquarters located in Oakwood, Georgia.

=== ContiAsia ===
Conti Chia Tai International

Headquartered in Hong Kong, ContiAsia has been operating in China for almost three decades. ContiAsia operates more than thirty companies that are classified into one of its four business units: Conti Chia Tai International, ContiFeed Group, Great Wall Northeast Asia Corp, and Meat Merchandising.

- Conti Chia Tai International (CCTI) is a joint venture (50/50) with Thailand's largest agricultural company, Charoen Pokphand. It operates five feed mills, an aqua feed mill, and a premix plant in Guangdong Province in southern China.
- ContiFeed Group is majority-owned and operated by ContiGroup. With operations throughout China, production takes place mainly in central and northern China. These sites include four feed mills, more than ninety distribution nodes, and a poultry breeder farm and hatchery.
- Great Wall Northeast Asia Corporation (GWNAC) is only partially owned by ContiGroup. With operations located in the northeast and on the east coast of China, GWNAC operates six feed mills, four poultry breeder farms and hatcheries, five poultry processing plants, and three further processing facilities.
- Meat Merchandising is based in Hong Kong and Panyu. Its primary mission is to market and sell American and other foreign frozen poultry products in China. This is the primary method by which Wayne Farms and Sanderson Farms’ poultry products are sold in China.

=== Premium Standard Farms ===
Premium Standard Farms, Inc

Formed in 1988, Premium Standard Farms, Inc (PSF) was founded with the aim of creating a standardized method for which to produce premium pork. To accomplish this goal, the company decided to pursue full vertical integration – the first in the United States to do so. In 1998, ContiGroup Companies, Inc (formerly known as Continental Grain Company) acquired a majority interest in PSF. Today, Premium Standard Farms is the second-largest pork producer and the sixth largest processor in the United States with operations in Missouri, North Carolina, and Texas. The company sells fresh and frozen pork products to domestic retailers, further processors, foodservice providers and export customers from more than 20 countries.

In 2007 Premium Standard Farms was acquired by Smithfield Foods.

=== ContiLatin ===
As a business unit with operations in the United States, the Caribbean, and in Central and South America, ContiLatin manages many operations throughout the western hemisphere. The company operates a shrimp farm and hatchery in Ecuador and it also runs integrated poultry operations in both Venezuela and Peru. ContiLatin also operates feed and flour mills in the French West Indies and recently opened a new high-tech flour mill in Haiti with the Haitian government in a joint venture. Additionally, the company took over the grain trading business in Nicaragua becoming the largest trading company established in the region, also the company is invested in a joint venture in Atlantic Salmon of Maine and Ducktrap River Fish Farm to produce salmon, shrimp and seafood pâté. All of ContiLatin's operations receive continuous research and technical support from the division's Georgia-based ContiTec unit.

=== Five Rivers Ranch ===
Five Rivers Ranch

Formed in May 2005, Five Rivers Ranch Cattle Feeding LLC is an independently operated joint venture between CGC's ContiBeef and Smithfield Beef Group's MF Cattle Feeding companies. Through the combined feeding capability of Smithfield's four feed yards and ContiBeef's six feed yards, Five Rivers Ranch has become the largest cattle feeding operation in the world with a combined feeding capacity of more than 800,000 head. With its headquarters in Loveland, Colorado, this new company employs more than 650 employees in facilities throughout Texas, Colorado, Kansas, Oklahoma, and Idaho.

In 2009, Five Rivers, or "ContiBeef" was acquired by Brazilian protein producer JBS. In 2010 Five Rivers took over Calfsource.

=== ContiInvestments ===
ContiInvestments is the financial wing of ContiGroup companies. It handles a variety of assets including investments in securities, real estate, and private equity. Additionally, it holds considerable investments in the areas of food and agribusiness, insurance, health care, financial services, transportation, and computer systems and software.

== See also ==
- Impact of the COVID-19 pandemic on the meat industry in the United States
