= Freiburg (disambiguation) =

Freiburg can refer to:

- Freiburg im Breisgau, a large city in Baden-Württemberg, Germany
  - University of Freiburg (Albert-Ludwigs-Universität Freiburg), an institution of higher learning founded in 1457 in Freiburg im Breisgau
  - Freiburg (district), a former district in Baden-Württemberg which was merged into the district Breisgau-Hochschwarzwald in 1973
  - Freiburg (region), an administrative district in Baden-Württemberg
- Freiburg, Lower Saxony, a municipality in the district of Stade in Lower Saxony whose full name is Freiburg an der Elbe
- Fribourg, a Swiss city, whose German name is Freiburg im Üechtland
  - Canton of Fribourg
- Świebodzice, a Polish city, whose German name is Freiburg in Schlesien
- Nova Friburgo ("New Fribourg" in English), a Brazilian town named for the Swiss canton
- Fraiburgo, a southern Brazilian town
- SC Freiburg, a German football club in the Bundesliga
- Freiburger FC, a German football club
- Freiburg (7th Sea), a 2000 supplement for the role-playing game 7th Sea

== See also ==
- Freiberg (disambiguation)
- Freyburg (disambiguation)
- Fryeburg, Maine
- Friberg
- Fribourg (disambiguation)
- Freiburger (disambiguation)
