= Allen Family Foods =

American food processor

Allen Family Foods, Inc
- Type: Private
- Industry: Manufacturing
- Founded: 1919
- Headquarters: Seaford, Delaware, United States
- Key people: Bob Turley, (President and CEO), Charles C. Allen, III, (President 1971-2009); Charles Clarence, (founder); Nellie G Allen, (founder)
- Products: Chicken
- Revenue: ▲ Unknown
- Website: www.allenfamilyfoods.com

Allen Family Foods was a large American producer and exporter of chicken, headquartered in Seaford, Delaware. Founded in 1919 by Charles C. Allen and Nellie G. Allen as a small local hatchery. At one time Allen Family Foods was the world's 18th-largest producer of chicken products, producing 10.5 million pounds (4.8 million kg) of finished products per week. Their network of 500 independent growers houses 25 million chickens at any given time. It employed 3,400 people in three states (Delaware, Maryland, and North Carolina), with an annual payroll of $90 million. under the slogan is "The Quality Chicken People".

Allen's operated a hatchery alone until 1971, when it bought its first processing plant, near Cordova, Maryland. The plant, formerly owned by Esskay, was then leased to Ralston-Purina under the agreement that Allen would process the chickens and sell them under Ralston's Checkerboard Square label. Allen's was informed in 1974 that Ralston-Purina would not be renewing the agreement, and Allen's took over the plant entirely. It mostly did custom processing for Holly Farms until 1980, when it started selling chickens under its own label throughout the Northeast. Eventually, it acquired two additional processing plants and an egg production company. It also owned a rendering plant in Linkwood, Maryland, where chicken byproducts are turned into feed and dog food.

The company filed for bankruptcy in June 2011 and was subsequently sold off. The smaller company continues as Seaford-based Allen Harim Foods LLC.

== Facilities ==
| Function | Location |
|---|---|
| Headquarters | Seaford, DE |
| Processing Plants | Cordova, MD - Harbeson, DE |
| Hatcheries | Dagsboro, DE - Hurlock, MD, Seaford, DE |
| Breeder Egg Production | Liberty, NC |
| Feed Mills | Delmar, DE - Seaford, DE |
| Rendering Plant | Linkwood, MD |

Allen Family Foods' facilities were sold between 2010 and 2011. The Hurlock and Delmar facilities belong to Amick Farms LLC and the remaining sold property was reorganized under Allen Harim Foods.

== See also ==
- Impact of the 2019–20 coronavirus pandemic on the meat industry in the United States
