= Freiburger =

Freiburger usually refers to the city Freiburg im Breisgau in Germany or a person or thing from there. Examples include:

- Freiburger FC, a football team (Soccer)
- Freiburger Barockorchester, an orchestra
- Freiburger Münster (Freiburg Minster), a cathedral
- Freiburger Pilsner, a beer produced by Ganter Brewery

Freiburger can also mean:

- Mark Freiburger, an American film director
- Vern Freiburger, a Major League Baseball player
- Freiburger, a synonym for the German wine grape Freisamer

== See also ==
- Freiburg (disambiguation)
