= Kenneth Sullivan =

- Born: Kenneth Marc Sullivan
- Education: Virginia Commonwealth University
- Occupation: Businessman
- Title: CEO and president of Smithfield Foods
- Term: 2015–2021
- Successor: Dennis Organ
- Board member of: Smithfield Foods; WH Group

Kenneth Marc Sullivan is an American businessman, and was the chief executive officer and president of Smithfield Foods from 2015 to November 2020.

== Career ==
=== Smithfield Foods ===
Sullivan joined Smithfield Foods in 2003. He has been chief financial officer, chief accounting officer, executive vice president and vice president of finance, and was named chief operating officer and president of Smithfield Foods in December 2015. He was shortly thereafter promoted to chief executive officer, and from January 2016 was a director of Smithfield Foods and its Chinese parent company WH Group.

During the summer of 2020, animal rights activists from Direct Action Everywhere attacked Sullivan's home, along with some Smithfield facilities, by spraying it with pig feces. After the attack they displayed a banner with a profanity-laden slogan. A video of the incident received at least 700,000 views on YouTube.

In November 2020, Sullivan was succeeded as president and CEO of Smithfield Foods by Dennis Organ, and promptly left the company after briefly working as an adviser to the new CEO.

=== Consulting and accounting ===
Sullivan worked in consulting and accounting for 12 years before joining Smithfield Foods. He assisted clients in manufacturing, technology, and government contracting while working for Arthur Andersen in Washington, D.C.

== Education ==
Sullivan earned a bachelor's degree from Virginia Commonwealth University.

== See also ==
- Impact of the 2019–20 coronavirus pandemic on the meat industry in the United States
