= Impact of the COVID-19 pandemic on the meat industry in the United States =

Impact of COVID-19

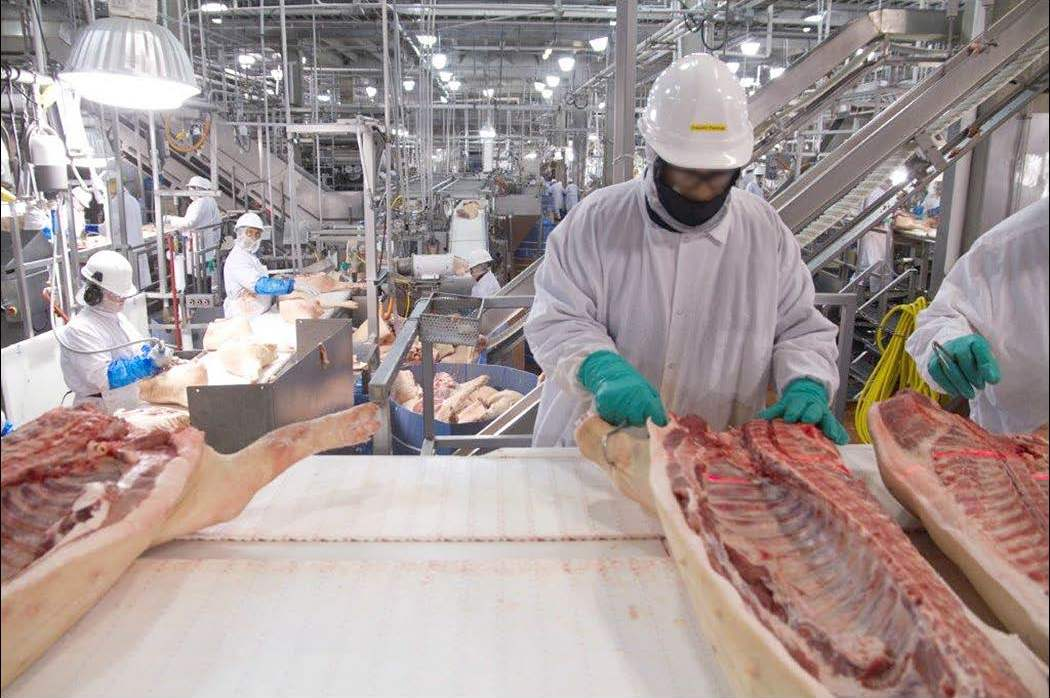
Workers in an American hog slaughtering and processing plant

The meat industry has been severely affected by the COVID-19 pandemic in the United States. Outbreaks of the virus took place in factories operated by the meat packing industry and the poultry processing industry. These outbreaks affected dozens of plants, leading to closures of some factories and disruption of others, and posed a significant threat to the meat supply in the United States. The damage the COVID-19 pandemic brought to the meatpacking industry was unexpected and resulted in a sharp reduction of meat processing and capacity reduction of meatpacking companies.

By September 13, 2020, at least 42,534 workers at meatpacking plants had contracted the coronavirus, and at least 203 had died. COVID-19 cases had been discovered in at least 494 meatpacking plants.

== Background ==
The United States meat industry was worth $213 billion in 2020. The meatpacking industry employed 474,000 workers, of whom 194,000 were categorized as frontline meatpacking workers in slaughterhouses and processing plants. 44.4% of meatpacking workers were Hispanic, and 25.2% were Black. 51.5% of the frontline meatpacking workers were immigrants, compared to 17% of the general workforce in the United States. Before the pandemic, the United States pork industry was expanding, with a 12% increase in pork processing from 2017 to 2019.

According to a 2016 report by the federal Government Accountability Office (GAO), illnesses among meat and poultry workers were relatively high compared with other manufacturing sector workers, even before the pandemic began; meat and poultry workers were also less likely to report illness because of fear of job loss. Employees work close together in plants, making social distancing "virtually impossible" according to a Food & Water Watch spokesperson.

CDC guidelines recommending routine sanitation and social distancing measures were criticized by workers and managers alike as "non-enforceable". In April 2020, the United States Department of Agriculture (USDA) relaxed protections at 15 poultry plants by allowing an increase in poultry production speeds, which the United Food and Commercial Workers International Union said would lead to more crowded working conditions and greater risk of transmitting COVID-19.

== Overall impact ==
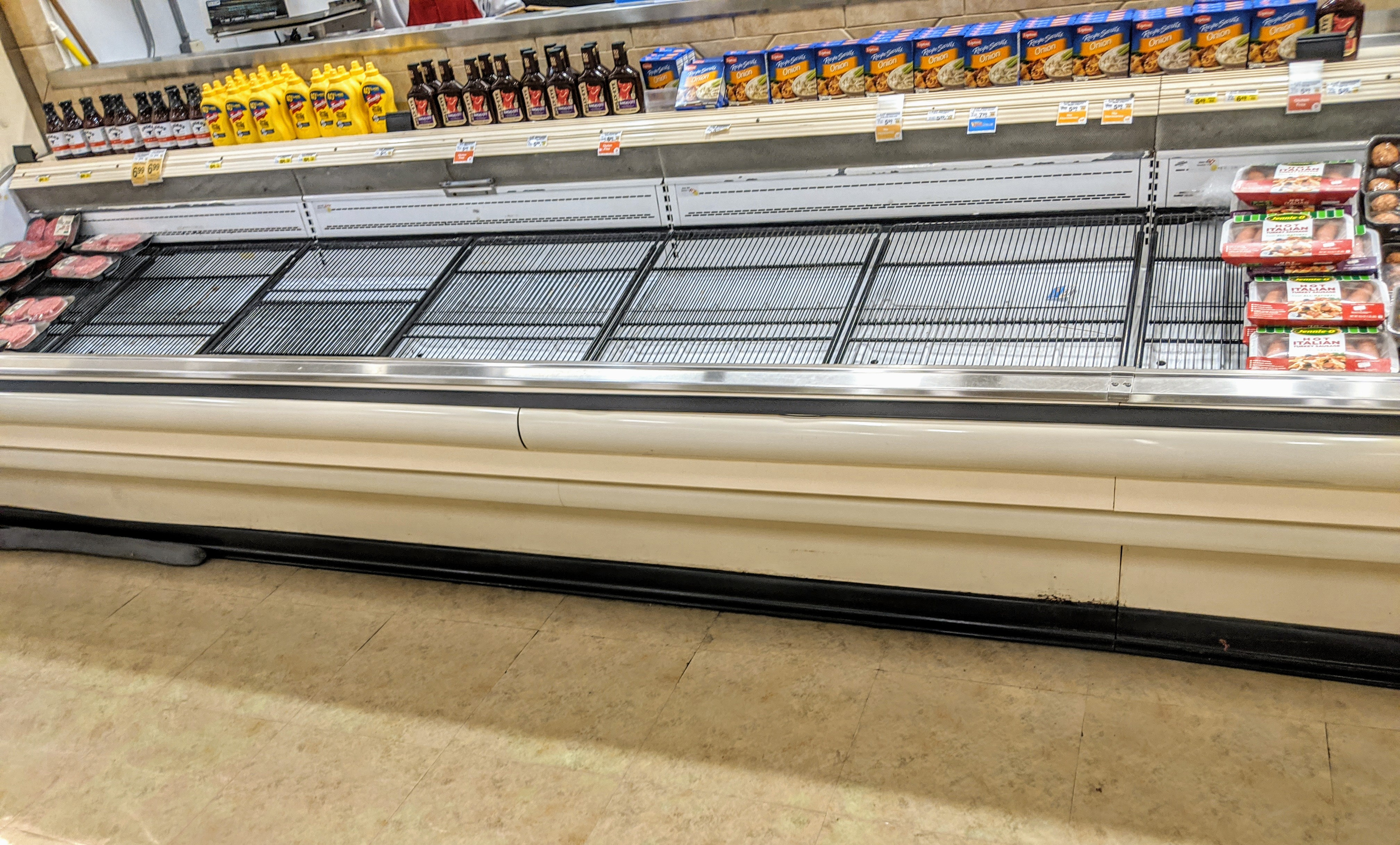
An almost empty meat counter at a California supermarket during the pandemic

By April 23, 2020, there were more than 3,400 reported positive cases in meatpacking facilities in 62 plants in 23 states. By May 1, a tally of meatpacking and processed food plants (including bakeries and dairy plants) counted over 99 facilities with confirmed cases of COVID-19 and over 6,800 workers who had tested positive, with 25 deaths. As April ended, the Centers for Disease Control and Prevention issued a report stating that by April 27, at least 4,913 meat and poultry plant workers had COVID-19. Cases were reported in 115 plants located in 19 states, and at least 20 people had died. Sociologist Lourdes Gouveia said the outbreaks revealed longstanding dangerous conditions that meatpackers face at work.

=== Impact on food supply ===
Christine McCracken, a meat analyst at worldwide agricultural financial institution Rabobank, said that U.S. meat production had declined 20% by late April 2020, and predicted that wholesale meat prices would rise. She said that especially popular items like ground beef were likely to increase in price at the retail level. An investigation by USA Today and the Midwest Center for Investigative Reporting concluded that by April 21, "coronavirus infections had spread in at least 48 U.S. meatpacking plants, sickening more than 2,200 people and killing 17," and that "The outbreaks also have prompted the closure of at least 17 facilities."

According to a report in The New York Times, the coronavirus pandemic "has revealed how these plants are becoming the weakest link in the nation's food supply chain, posing a serious challenge to meat production." Julie Niederhoff, an associate professor of supply chain management at Syracuse University, said that "Slaughterhouses are a critical bottleneck in the system". Speaking for the meat industry, Smithfield CEO Kenneth Sullivan said that "it is impossible to keep our grocery stores stocked if our plants are not running," adding that "These facility closures will also have severe, perhaps disastrous, repercussions for many in the supply chain, first and foremost our nation's livestock farmers."

According to the Daily Livestock Report published by Steiner Consulting, slaughter of cattle in the United States declined 19% in the second and third weeks of April 2020 compared to the same period in 2019. According to a report by Bloomberg News on April 23, cold-storage facilities in the country only had enough supply to cover production for another two weeks, and with most plant shutdowns lasting at least that long, shortages would be inevitable.

On May 4, Tyson Foods informed its investors that U.S. pork production had declined 50%. The same day, Costco announced restrictions on sales of fresh meat, limiting customers to purchasing no more than three items among poultry, beef and pork products. Grocery store chains Kroger and Wegmans imposed similar restrictions on customer meat purchases. Other regional grocery store chains such as Price Chopper Supermarkets and Tops Friendly Markets followed suit in restricting meat purchases. By May 5, Wendy's had stopped serving beef hamburgers at about 20% of its 5,500 U.S. restaurants. The company only uses fresh but not frozen ground beef, and the shortages were concentrated in states located near where major beef processing plants had closed. Some locations were posting locally printed signs encouraging customers to buy chicken sandwiches instead. The production of prepared foods was also impacted.

The Guardian reported on April 29 that two million farm animals had been culled as a result of the meat plant closures. As of May 19, 10 million hens had been culled, and around the same number of pigs were scheduled to be culled by September.

In April 2020, beef and pork production was reduced by more than a third. For the week ending May 30, pork production was down 6% year-on-year.

=== Culling techniques and concern over animal welfare ===
Methods of culling included gassing, suffocation, drowning, shooting, anaesthetic overdose, "blunt force trauma" and ventilation shutdown (VSD), which animal welfare groups have criticized as inhumane. The technique of VSD was endorsed by the American Association of Swine Veterinarians (AASV), and guidelines for the method have been issued by the American Veterinary Medical Association (AVMA). Evidence of substandard VSD culling was found at some farms.

== Policy and enforcement ==
Two inspectors for the United States Department of Agriculture have died of COVID-19 as of April 23, 2020. One of those inspectors was based in the Chicago office of the Food Safety Inspection Service and was on a "patrol assignment" visiting various meat processing facilities each day to conduct inspections. At least 137 USDA meat inspectors have tested positive for coronavirus, and 704 others have stopped working due to lack of protective equipment in a high-risk environment.

On April 26, 2020, the United States Labor Department's Occupational Safety and Health Administration and the Centers for Disease Control and Prevention issued guidelines for meat packing and meat processing plants, calling for six feet of separation between workers, temperature checks, health screenings and use of cloth facemasks by workers.

When slaughterhouses were being closed to stop the spread of the virus, meat companies lobbied the federal government to take steps to keep plants open.

On April 28, Donald Trump issued an executive order under the Defense Production Act, to ensure meat plants stay open. White House General Counsel Pat Cipollone consulted with various companies for the order. It was supported by companies but drew criticism from labor unions, who raised concerns about worker safety and urged the administration to prioritize enforcable safety standards and support for infected workers.

=== CDC advice to meatpackers ===
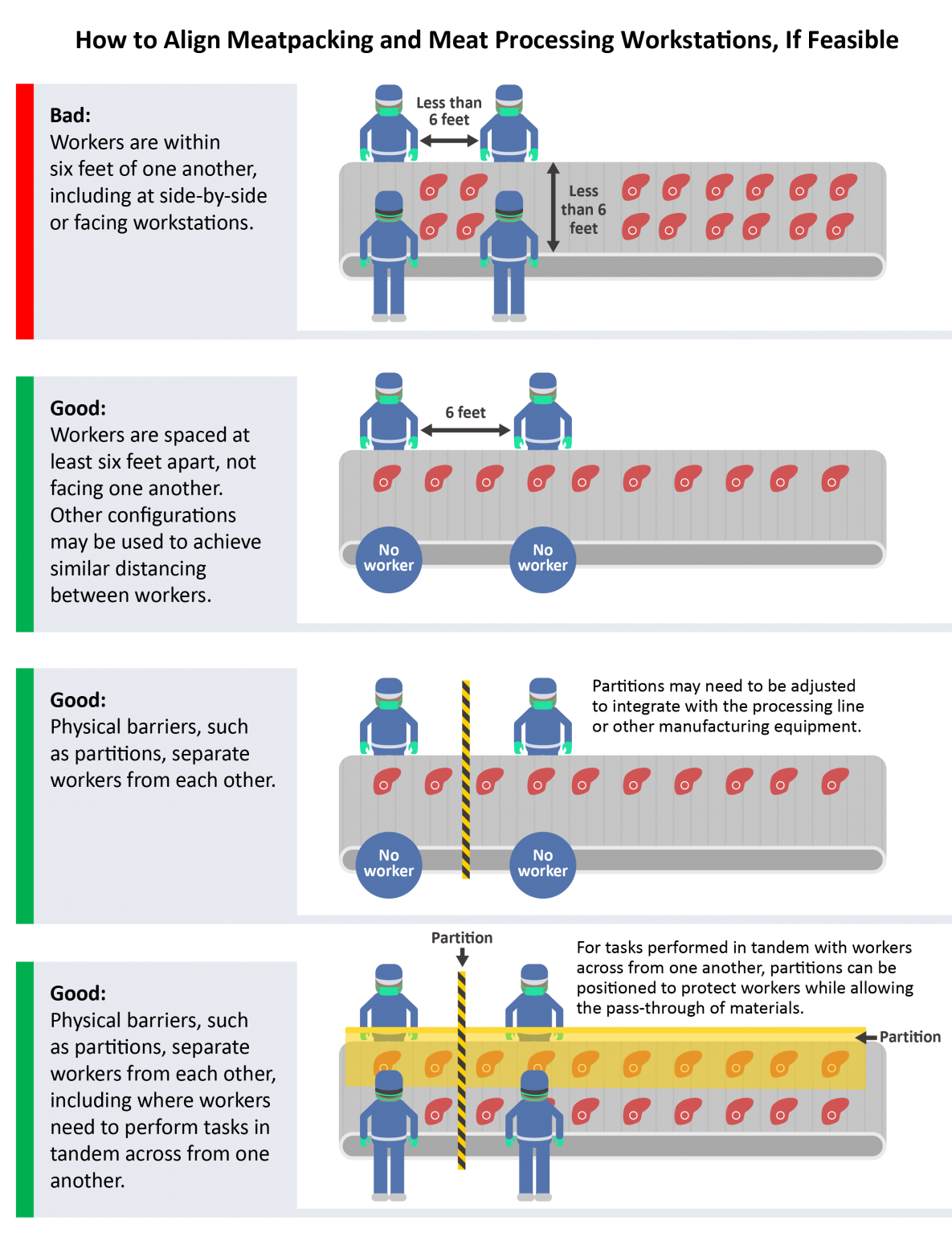
An infographic on ways to control COVID-19 hazards in meat processing facilities

Meat and poultry processing facilities are considered critical infrastructure workers, and CDC advises that they may be permitted to continue work following potential exposure to COVID-19, provided they remain asymptomatic and additional precautions are implemented to protect them and the community. However, their work environments may contribute substantially to their potential exposures, as they often work close to one another on processing lines during prolonged work shifts.

For engineering controls, CDC and OSHA recommend configuring communal work environments so that workers are spaced at least six feet apart including along processing lines, using physical barriers such as strip curtains or plexiglass to separate workers from each other, and ensuring adequate ventilation that minimizes air from fans blowing from one worker directly at another worker. For administrative controls, they recommend staggering workers' arrival, break, and departure times, cohorting workers so they are always assigned to the same shifts with the same coworkers, encouraging single-file movement through the facility, avoiding carpooling to and from work, and considering a program of screening workers before entry into the workplace and setting criteria for return to work of recovered workers and for exclusion of sick workers.

For personal protective equipment, they recommend face shields and considering allowing voluntary use of filtering facepiece respirators such as N95 masks. They also recommend wearing cloth face masks that should be replaced if they become wet, soiled, or otherwise visibly contaminated during the work shift, although cloth face masks are not considered to be personal protective equipment.

The CDC's advice may be difficult to implement, as facilities are designed for maximum efficiency with workers working close together. Wearing a mask can be hard during the physically challenging and messy work. Installing recommended ventilation may be expensive for older plants. As of late May, employees at meat plants were still "standing elbow-to-elbow" and coming to work with symptoms for fear of not being paid. Physical barriers and face shields were used, though some masks were reported to be of low quality.

== Cases by processor ==
=== Allen Harim ===
Allen Harim is a regional chicken processor based in Delaware, owned by the Harim Group of South Korea. On April 8, the company announced that it would begin "depopulating flocks in the field" due to a labor shortage caused by the pandemic. The company was unable to process its normal volume because about 50% of its employees were not reporting to work. About two million chickens were to be killed and disposed of at local farms in Delaware and Maryland and would not reach the market.

=== American Foods Group ===
American Foods Group is the 5th largest beef processor in the United States. On April 21, health officials announced that 39 coronavirus cases were associated with an American Foods Group plant in Green Bay, Wisconsin. By May 1, 203 workers had tested positive at the Green Bay plant.

Details of another major COVID-19 outbreak were announced on May 28, 2020, at another American Foods Group meat packing facility in Long Prairie, Minnesota, doing business as Long Prairie Packing. As of that date, 227 of the 296 confirmed cases in Todd County, Minnesota, were employees of that facility, accounting for 76.7% of all cases in the county. These 227 cases represent 36% of the facility's workforce. As of May 28, the facility planned to continue operation. As of May 28, this was the third largest COVID-19 outbreak at a meat packing or processing facility in Minnesota.

=== Bell and Evans ===
Bell & Evans, founded in 1894, is the oldest poultry brand in the United States. The company employs 1,700 workers at its modern chicken processing plant in Fredericksburg, Pennsylvania, and is one of the biggest employers in Lebanon County, Pennsylvania. The company processes organic, antibiotic-free chicken products which are sold through Whole Foods markets.

One worker and the spouse of another worker employed at the plant have died of COVID-19. Indications are that there is an outbreak at the plant, but the company has not released any statistics. 30 cars conducted a mock funeral procession outside the plant on May 1, 2020. Patty Torres, an activist with Make the Road Pennsylvania, said "We're calling on Bell & Evans to shut down the plant immediately and clean their plant completely and pay their employees fully … before (COVID-19) claims more lives and devastates more families". An investigation by The Philadelphia Inquirer concluded that eight workers who carpooled together contracted COVID-19, including one who died.

=== Cargill Meat Solutions ===
Cargill Meat Solutions is a division of Cargill, the largest privately owned company in the United States, and a major food producer. The meat division processes beef and turkey for the North American market. In April 2020, 130 workers at a Cargill meatpacking plant in Hazleton, Pennsylvania, were diagnosed with coronavirus, and the plant closed. On April 16, Cargill announced that a plant in Fort Morgan, Colorado, was reducing operations after 18 workers were confirmed positive and one worker died. By May 18, local public health officials confirmed that 68 workers at the Cargill plant in Fort Morgan had COVID-19, and three workers had died. By June 18, nearly 100 workers at the Fort Morgan plant had tested positive for coronavirus, and four had died.

=== Central Valley Meat Company ===
The Central Valley Meat Company operates a beef packing plant in Hanford, California that processes 1,500 cattle per day. As of May 13, local public health officials reported that 182 workers at the plant tested positive for coronavirus.

=== Conagra Brands ===
Conagra Brands is an American company that manufactures packaged foods. On April 17, Conagra closed a plant in Marshall, Missouri, after about 20 employees tested positive for coronavirus. The plant, which employed about 700 workers, manufactured frozen meals including chicken and turkey pot pies sold under the Banquet Foods brand name.

=== Empire Kosher ===
Empire Kosher is the largest producer of kosher poultry in the United States. On April 2, an Empire Kosher chicken processing plant in Mifflintown, Pennsylvania, that employed 550 workers closed after two employees tested positive for the coronavirus. This is the company's main facility. The plant was originally scheduled to reopen on April 13 but that was delayed for at least a week.

=== Foster Farms ===
Foster Farms is a California-based chicken and turkey processing company operating mainly on the west coast. By April 20, four workers were diagnosed with COVID-19 at a Foster Farms plant in Kelso, Washington. Health officials in Cowlitz County, Washington, described the cases as a "cluster". On April 22, Foster Farms reported that an employee at one of its two plants in Fresno, California, had tested positive for coronavirus. Those two plants employ about 3,000 workers. On August 13, Gurpal Samra, the mayor of Livingston, California, announced that Merced County officials had informed him that 217 workers at the local Foster Farms chicken processing plant had COVID-19, and that two workers had died. According to Samra, "There are no guidelines, no books, no manuals, on how to deal with this anywhere at the state level. Even the federal government is in disarray. So Merced County Health, who's never had to deal with this either, is trying to find the best way to work with it."

On August 18, the Merced County Public Health Department confirmed that over 300 workers were infected and that seven workers had died. The plant employs over 3,700 people. On August 26, the Merced County Health Department ordered the plant in Livingston closed. By that time, 358 workers were confirmed to have the coronavirus, and eight had died. California Attorney General Xavier Becerra stated "Foster Farms' poultry operation in Livingston, California, has experienced an alarming spread of COVID-19 among its workers. Nobody can ignore the facts: It's time to hit the reset button on Foster Farms' Livingston plant." The following day, the California Department of Public Health released a letter stating that Foster Farms has a "legal obligation to comply with public health orders and guidance, as well as an obligation to its workers and to the people of Merced County and surrounding counties and that these obligations compel Foster Farms to immediately comply with the order issued yesterday by the County". The agency reported that "other Foster Farms facilities in multiple counties also are experiencing outbreaks".

=== Hormel Foods ===
Hormel Foods, well known for its canned pork SPAM product, also processes other pork products as well as beef, lamb and chicken. On April 18, local health officials shut down a Hormel Foods plant in Rochelle, Illinois, that employed 800 people after at least 24 workers tested positive for coronavirus. On April 21, Hormel announced the closure of three meat processing plants, including its Alma Foods plant in Alma, Kansas. That plant employs about 100 workers and at least one worker tested positive for the coronavirus. Hormel also closed its Don Miguel Foods factory in Dallas, Texas, which is a joint venture with a Mexico City company, Herdez Del Fuerte. The plant made pork, beef and chicken burritos and tacos, and employed about 700 workers. On April 24, Hormel announced the closure of two plants in Willmar, Minnesota, after 14 workers tested positive for coronavirus. These Jennie-O turkey plants employed over 1,200 workers.

=== Indiana Packers ===
Indiana Packers is a pork processing company that is a joint venture between Japanese companies Mitsubishi Corporation and Itoham Foods. The company's main plant is located in Delphi, Indiana and it also operates a ham plant in Holland Charter Township, Michigan. After a coronavirus outbreak, the company closed its Delphi plant on April 24. During the closure, 301 workers tested positive for coronavirus in a plant that employs about 2300 people. At full capacity, this plant can slaughter and process 17,000 hogs a day. The Dephi plant reopened on May 7.

=== JBS USA ===
JBS USA is a wholly owned subsidiary of JBS S.A., a Brazilian company that is the world's largest processor of pork and beef. At least 277 JBS USA workers at a plant in Greeley, Colorado, were infected with coronavirus in April 2020, leading to the closure of this large meat processing operation with over 3,000 employees. By April 15, four of the workers had died. The Weld County, Colorado, Department of Public Health, where Greeley is located, reported that the JBS plant had a "work while sick" culture. The company denied that. On April 22, JBS announced that the Greeley plant would reopen on April 24, after a nine-day closure. When local ABC News reporters approached the plant while investigating working conditions, security guards working for JBS responded aggressively, threatening to break their camera even though they were on public property. Union president Kim Cordova of the United Food and Commercial Workers Local 7 said "I think the workers are being sacrificed," adding, "I think that this could potentially be a death sentence." The ABC News team confirmed that JBS had promised to test all of the plant's employees but did not keep their promise, after the first day of testing revealed that a significant percentage of plant managers and supervisors were positive for coronavirus.

On June 24, JBS sent a cease and desist letter to United Food and Commercial Workers Local 7, which represents the workers at the Greeley plant, saying that the union "has adopted a strategy of generating negative media attention and public opinion". Cordova, the union local's president, replied, "Unfortunately your cease and desist letter, threatening to stifle our voice, and those of our members, as well as pursuing claims for unfounded, speculative, and unrecoverable damages is rife with numerous inaccuracies, suppositions, and erroneous conclusions I won't spend time rebutting in their entirety" adding that her statements were "nothing more than the exercise of our Constitutional and legal rights, regardless of how you improperly characterize them." According to Colorado public health officials, as of May 18, 321 workers at the Greeley plant have tested positive for COVID-19, and eight of those workers have died. On June 28, United Food and Commercial Workers Local 7 organized a memorial event in Greeley to commemorate the six union members at the JBS plant who had died of COVID-19. U.S. Senator Michael Bennet was among those who gave speeches outside the union hall. Afterwards, a car caravan of family members, plant workers and supporters drove around the city, passing two billboards with photos of the workers who died.

JBS closed its plant in Souderton, Pennsylvania, on April 10 after a 70-year-old union shop steward for the United Food and Commercial Workers died of COVID-19. On April 20, JBS closed a pork processing plant employing over 2,000 people in Worthington, Minnesota, after at least 20 workers tested positive. By April 20, 60 workers had tested positive at a JBS plant in Plainwell, Michigan, and one had died. The plant continued operating. By April 21, 237 cases of coronavirus were associated with a JBS plant in Grand Island, Nebraska, according to local health officials. On April 21, local health officials reported that they were investigating a coronavirus outbreak at a JBS plant in Cactus, Texas, in rural Moore County, Texas. The factory is described as a "massive meatpacking plant, which processes a significant portion of the nation's beef". Moore County has one of the highest rates of coronavirus cases in Texas. Public health officials announced on April 22 that 147 cases of coronavirus were associated with a JBS meatpacking plant in Green Bay, Wisconsin. On April 26, JBS announced that the Green Bay plant, which employed 1,200 workers, was being closed. In April, 34 workers at a JBS plant in Marshalltown, Iowa tested positive for COVID-19, and then the company stopped reporting new cases. The plant employs 2,400 workers. On May 15, a 62-year-old worker at the plant died of COVID-19, one week before his scheduled retirement date.

Pilgrim's Pride is a subsidiary of JBS-USA that operates chicken processing plants. In late April, an outbreak began at the Pilgrim's Pride plant in Lufkin, Texas. On May 8, a worker at the Lufkin plant was found dead in her home after being diagnosed with COVID-19. After the West Virginia National Guard conducted coronavirus tests of part of the workforce at the Pilgrim's Pride plant in Moorefield, West Virginia, it was announced that 18 workers had tested positive. The plant employs 940 workers and 520 of them were tested. By May 11, 194 COVID-19 cases had been diagnosed among workers at the Pilgrim's Pride plant in Cold Spring, Minnesota, which employs about 1,100 workers. That same day, 75 to 85 cars filled with workers drove around the plant, honking horns and demanding over a loudspeaker that it be closed for two weeks. At least one worker has tested positive at the Pilgrim's Pride plant in Chattanooga, Tennessee, and other workers have tested positive at the company's plant in Timberville, Virginia, where dozens of workers protested in early April, although the company has declined to release the number of cases there.

In mid-May 2020, CEO Andre Nogueira said that the pandemic would probably reduce U.S. meat production for months. Nogueira said JBS USA would "not be able to go to full capacity anytime soon", with facilities being modified to allow physical distancing and 10% of employees asked not to come to work due to the risk of COVID-19. On June 8, the local health department reported that 287 workers at a JBS plant in Hyrum, Utah had tested positive for coronavirus. The facility employs about 1,400 workers.

=== Koch Foods ===
Koch Foods is a major U S. chicken processor, specializing in "small birds". On Friday, May 15, Koch Foods confirmed that 11 of the workers at its Chattanooga, Tennessee plant had been diagnosed with COVID-19.

=== Long Prairie Packing Company ===
The Long Prairie Packing Company operates a beef processing plant in Long Prairie, Minnesota that employs 500 to 600 workers. The company is owned by American Foods Group. On June 9, the Minnesota Department of Health announced that 249 workers at the plant had tested positive for the coronavirus.

=== National Beef ===
National Beef is a large beef packing company which is controlled by Marfrig, Brazil's second largest food processing company. A plant owned by National Beef in Tama, Iowa, closed for a week after 177 workers were diagnosed with coronavirus at a facility that employed over 500 workers. The plant reopened on April 20. By mid-June, more than 250 workers at the Tama plant had tested positive for the coronavirus.

Kansas Health Secretary Lee Norman reported on April 24 that 250 workers at the state's six meatpacking plants had COVID-19. Over an 11-day period in mid-April, Ford County, Kansas, where both National Beef and Cargill operate plants in Dodge City, went from 16 coronavirus cases to 288 diagnosed cases and Seward County, Kansas, which has a National Beef plant in Liberal, went from six cases to 125.

=== OSI Group ===
OSI Group is an American multinational meat processing company that operates 65 plants in 17 countries. On April 20, OSI Group closed a plant in Chicago, Illinois. Thirty workers tested positive at the 500-employee plant, which makes beef, pork, chicken and turkey products. The company announced their intention to install body temperature monitoring systems for workers. Amick Farms is a subsidiary of OSI Group that operates a chicken processing plant in Hurlock, Maryland that employs 1,362 workers. On June 12, Maryland health officials reported that 150 workers had tested positive for coronavirus and that three workers had died.

=== Perdue Farms ===
Perdue Farms is the third largest producer of chickens in the United States. In June, the company reported that 58 workers at its plant in Salisbury, Maryland had tested positive for coronavirus and that two workers had died. The plant employs 593 workers.

=== Quality Pork Processors ===
Quality Pork Processors operates a hog slaughterhouse in Austin, Minnesota that supplies the Hormel factory in that city. The plant employs 1,300 workers. On June 5, the company reported that about 170 of its workers had tested positive for coronavirus.

=== Rantoul Foods ===
Rantoul Foods operates a pork processing plant in Rantoul, Illinois, and is one of the largest meat processing plants in central Illinois. The plant's first case of COVID-19 was reported on April 25, 2020. Two days later, health inspectors visited the plant and found that it was not following appropriate infection control measures. Although, those measures were not issued by the CDC until April 26, 2020. Rantoul Foods adopted the safety protocols outlined in the CDC guidance and were in compliance as of April 28, 2020, and facilitated onsite testing for its employees on May 8 and 9.

By May 22, at least 87 Rantoul workers had tested positive for COVID-19. The number grew to 91 by June 2. However, there was no work contact among the new employees who tested positive after May 9, and the timing of those tests would indicate that they are not related to the initial outbreak and likely the result of community spread. On May 29, 2020, an environmental virus survey conducted by departments at the University of Illinois found no evidence of SARS-CoV2 in any of the samples taken throughout the plant.

=== Ruiz Foods ===
Ruiz Foods is a manufacturer of frozen Mexican food items, including chicken burritos and beef burritos, sold under the Old Monterey brand name. It is the largest manufacturer of frozen burritos in the United States. As of May 13, 174 workers at the company's plants in Dinuba, California and Tulare, California had tested positive for coronavirus.

=== Seaboard Foods ===
Seaboard Foods is a major American vertically integrated pork producer. On May 4, the company announced that 116 workers at its plant in Guymon, Oklahoma had tested positive for COVID-19. The company has about 2,700 workers in Texas County, Oklahoma, where the Guymon plant is located.

=== Seaboard Triumph Foods ===
Seaboard Triumph Foods is a joint venture between Seaboard Foods and Triumph Foods, that has operated a new pork processing plant in Sioux City, Iowa since 2017. Five large pig fams in Midwestern states are also part of the venture. The plant, almost a million square feet in size, processed three million pigs in its first year. A second shift started working in 2018, doubling production to six million pigs a year. The facility is reported to be the world's second largest fresh pork plant, and it employs approximately 2,400 workers. On May 11, the company confirmed that 59 workers have tested positive for the coronavirus. As of June 3, 121 employees at the Sioux City plant had tested positive for the coronavirus. On November 23 a group of judges ruled that conditions at the plant were unsafe and reversed a prior order that had denied unemployment benefits to several workers, and instead granted each of the workers unemployment benefits. Further she noted in a terse ruling, "I find the working conditions were unsafe."

=== Smithfield Foods ===
Smithfield Foods is a wholly owned subsidiary of WH Group of China, the world's largest pork processor. In mid March, Kenneth Sullivan, the CEO of Smithfield Foods, wrote to Pete Ricketts, the governor of Nebraska, expressing "grave concerns" that calling for social distancing was a threat to the reliability of the food production workforce, adding that "Social distancing is a nicety that makes sense only for people with laptops."

In mid-April 2020 the Smithfield plant in Sioux Falls, South Dakota, became a "hotspot" for the pandemic, with 300 of the plant's 3,700 employees testing positive for the disease. On April 12 the company announced the indefinite closure of the plant, which processes 4 to 5 percent of the pork production in the United States. Kenneth Sullivan, president and CEO of Smithfield Foods, said the closure of this and other meat processing plants "is pushing our country perilously close to the edge in terms of our meat supply." By April 14, 438 workers in Smithfield's Sioux Falls plant were confirmed to be infected with the coronavirus, with Sullivan stating, "We have to operate these processing plants even when we have COVID." By April 17, the Sioux Falls outbreak had grown to 777 cases, of whom 634 were Smithfield employees and 143 were other people who got infected after contact with a Smithfield employee. A Smithfield spokesperson blamed the "large immigrant population" at the Sioux Falls plant for the outbreak, commenting that "living circumstances in certain cultures are different than they are with your traditional American family", and rejecting charges that the company had failed to properly protect its workers against the pandemic.

On April 23, 2020, a 15-page report was issued by the Centers for Disease Control and Prevention (CDC) that concluded that language barriers exacerbated the spread of the virus in the Sioux Falls plant where about 40 languages are spoken. In addition to English, the top ten languages spoken by workers include "Spanish, Kunama, Swahili, Nepali, Tigrinya, Amharic, French, Oromo and Vietnamese." When workers showed symptoms of illness, they were sent home with information packets in English only. The CDC also reported that workers were offered a $500.00 "responsibility bonus" if they missed no work during the month of April.

On April 15, the company announced the closure of a plant in Cudahy, Wisconsin, that makes bacon and sausage, and a plant in Martin City, Missouri, that makes hams. A small number of employees in both facilities had tested positive for coronavirus Both plants were dependent on input from the Sioux Falls slaughterhouse. By April 15, 28 workers at the plant in Cudahy had tested positive. On April 24, Smithfield announced the closure of its plant in Monmouth, Illinois, after a coronavirus outbreak. The factory employed 1,700 workers and produced 3% of the fresh pork for the U. S. market. The same day, April 24, Smithfield announced that their plant in St. Charles, Illinois, was closing. After Nebraska National Guard troops increased testing in Crete, Nebraska, local health officials and the mayor announced that the local Smithfield pork processing plant would close on April 29. There were at least 47 confirmed cases of COVID-19 among workers at the plant, which employed about 2,000 workers.

The largest pork processing plant in the world is the Smithfield facility in Tar Heel, North Carolina. The plant employs 4,500 workers. On May 1, 2020, local health officials announced that 53 of the workers at the plant has tested positive for coronavirus. By May 7, that number had grown to 76 workers infected.

Smithfield owns the Farmer John plant in Vernon, California, which makes bacon, sausage and Dodger Dogs, mostly for the Southern California market. On May 22, a local health official reported that at least 140 workers at the plant had tested positive for coronavirus.

=== S&S Foods ===
In the last week of July, S&S Foods in Azusa, California was shut down by the Los Angeles County health department for failing to notify the department about 58 confirmed cases at its meat plant. The same company recalled 153,630 lbs of frozen ground meat for e.coli outbreak in 2008.

=== Stampede Meat ===
Stampede Meat is a company that operates four meat processing plants in the Chicago area, and one in New Mexico. On May 5, local health authorities reported that five workers at the Stampede Meat plant in Sunland Park, New Mexico had tested positive for the coronavirus. By May 21, at least 57 workers at the Sunland Park plant had tested positive for COVID-19.

=== Triumph Foods ===
In one Triumph Foods pork processing plant in Saint Joseph, Missouri, 373 workers who tested positive for coronavirus —17% of over 1500, in ongoing tests— all were asymptomatic; they will be furloughed using benefits under that company's COVID-19 wage continuation policy. By May 5, the case tally was at 412 workers infected. By May 16, at least 490 cases of COVID-19 were confirmed at the plant in Saint Joseph.

=== Tyson Foods ===
Tyson Foods is the world's second largest processor of chicken, beef, and pork. On April 6, 2020, a Tyson pork processing plant in Columbus Junction, Iowa, closed down after 148 workers tested positive for coronavirus, and two workers died. Officials including the sheriff in Black Hawk County, Iowa, were critical of Tyson Foods on April 17, after an outbreak began at a company plant in Waterloo, Iowa. Tyson finally closed the Waterloo plant on April 22. About 180 workers had tested positive for coronavirus out of a workforce of 2,800. According to an Associated Press report, the company said the shutdown "would deny a vital market to hog farmers and further disrupt the nation's meat supply". Tyson eventually re-opened its Waterloo plant after a closure of about two weeks. By then, over 1000 workers at the Waterloo plant had tested positive for the coronavirus. On May 17, an auto rally was held outside the plant, to support its workers. Signs in many languages spoken by immigrant workers were displayed. Five of the Waterloo plant workers have died of COVID-19.

On April 20, it was reported that 90 workers had tested positive at a Tyson beef and pork packing plant in Goodlettsville, Tennessee. The plant employs 1,600 workers. On April 17, Tyson announced that four poultry workers died who were associated with a Tyson chicken processing plant in Camilla, Georgia. Three worked inside the plant and another worked outside. The Retail, Wholesale and Department Store Union, which represents 2,000 workers at the plant, said that the three plant workers who died were women who had worked for Tyson for 13 to 35 years, and that many plant workers are "sick or in quarantine."

Steve Stouffer, president of the fresh meats division at Tyson Foods, expressed some resistance to universal testing of their workers. "Everybody wants to test meatpacking employees, but nobody is testing the communities around them to show what's the baseline," Stouffer said, adding "And until we know the baselines, my question has always been: Are we the cause or are we just the victim of our surroundings?" At least eight workers at a Tyson plant in Madison, Nebraska, had tested positive for coronavirus by April 20, according to local public health officials. By May 12, Tyson and local public health officials reported that 212 workers at the Madison plant had tested positive for coronavirus. Workers have also tested positive at other Tyson plants in Lexington, Nebraska, and Dakota City, Nebraska.

On April 21, Tyson announced the closure of a plant in Center, Texas, which is located in Shelby County, a rural county with a rate of coronavirus infection about four times higher than the state average. A local physician reported that over half of the county's cases were associated with the Tyson facility. On April 22, Tyson announced the closure of a pork processing plant in Logansport, Indiana, that employed more than 2,200 workers after 146 workers tested positive. The president of the Indiana Farm Bureau said that the organization is "extremely concerned about the closure of the Tyson pork processing facility. This is a devastating blow to the pork producers who sell hogs to Tyson." By May 1, the count of workers who have tested positive for coronavirus at the Logansport plant stood at 890.

On April 23, Tyson announced that a beef processing plant in Wallula, Washington, was closing. The plant employed 1,400 workers. Local public health officials announced that over 90 workers had tested positive for coronavirus, and one had died. Tyson executive Steve Stouffer said, "Unfortunately, the closure will mean reduced food supplies and presents problems to farmers who have no place to take their livestock. It's a complicated situation across the supply chain. By May 16, at least 277 workers at the Wallula plant has been infected with the coronavirus, and three had died.

On April 27, public health officials in Dakota County, Nebraska, which has a population of about 20,000 people, announced that 608 residents had tested positive for coronavirus, a rate about 40 times higher than the Omaha area. The county's biggest employer by far is the Tyson beef packing plant in Dakota City, Nebraska, which employs about 4,300 people. One worker at that plant has died of Covid-19, and local officials believe that the outbreak is centered in the Tyson plant. Eight workers at a Tyson chicken processing plant in Portland, Maine, have tested positive for coronavirus, and on April 28, state health officials called for all 400 workers to be tested for the virus. Tyson agreed, and said that it is considering closing the plant.

In early May, economist Steve Meyer, with agricultural risk management company Kerns and Associates, estimated that Tyson's pork production had declined 74%. By May 11, 4,585 cases of Covid-19 and 18 deaths were linked to Tyson plants in 15 states. At the Tyson plant in Amarillo, Texas, the Texas National Guard assisted in coronavirus testing of the 3,587 workers. When 1,380 test results were available on May 14, 410 workers had tested positive, which High Plains Public Radio called an "alarmingly high number". By May 14, a Tyson plant in Wilkesboro, North Carolina, has closed and reopened twice due to outbreaks of the coronavirus. On May 20, it was reported that 570 workers at the Wilkesboro plant had tested positive for COVID-19. On May 20, multiple employees informed reporters that 270 workers at a Tyson plant in Sherman, Texas had tested positive for COVID-19. The company confirmed that one worker at the plant had died.

On April 11, a complaint was filed with the Iowa Occupational Safety and Health Administration about conditions at the Tyson Foods plant in Perry, Iowa. It was claimed that employees worked "elbow to elbow" and that coronavirus was spreading. It took Iowa OSHA nine days to ask Tyson to respond and eight days until the company replied. On April 28, Iowa OSHA said that the company's voluntary efforts were "satisfactory", and the case was closed without inspecting the plant. One week later, public health officials announced that 730 workers at the Perry plant had tested positive for coronavirus, and that represented 58% of the workforce of 1,250 people. The local newspaper called the 58% positive infection rate "jaw-dropping". On June 26, Tyson Foods announced that 371 workers at their chicken processing plant in Noel, Missouri had tested positive for the coronavirus. The company tested 1,142 employees at the plant and 291 tested positive. A further 80 Noel workers tested positive in separate tests conducted outside the plant.

On June 21, the government of China announced that it was suspending imports of chicken from a Tyson factory. The company confirmed that the affected facility was its Berry Street plant in Springdale, Arkansas. Earlier in June, 227 workers tested positive for the coronavirus at that plant. Tyson announced that 481 workers had tested positive at its various facilities in northwest Arkansas. That represented 13% of its 3,748 workers in that region. On June 1, Tyson announced that 815 workers have tested positive for coronavirus at its pork plant in Storm Lake, Iowa among approximately 2,300 workers employed there. The company also reported that day that 224 workers tested positive at a beef and pork plant in Council Bluffs, Iowa. That factory employs about 1,500 people workers.

By June 12, over 25 Tyson workers had died of COVID-19. On June 25, a lawsuit was filed in Black Hawk County, Iowa district court against Tyson Foods and senior company executives, including chairman John H. Tyson and CEO Noel White. The suit was filed on behalf of the families of three workers at Tyson's Waterloo, Iowa plant who died of COVID-19. The lawsuit accuses Tyson of lying to its workers in the early days of the pandemic. The lawsuit states "Tyson intended by these false representations to deceive workers in the Waterloo facility ... and to induce them to continue working despite the uncontrolled COVID-19 outbreak at the plant and the health risks associated with working", and describes the company's behavior as an "incorrigible, willful and wanton disregard for workplace safety".

Tyson's Chief Executive Noel White said that the company's investment in automation would likely increase in light of the pandemic. In July 2020, Tyson Foods said it would hire 200 nurses and administrative personnel, and begin administering coronavirus tests at all of its U.S. production facilities, as part of the company's response to the pandemic.

=== Wayne Farms ===
Wayne Farms is a chicken processing company and a subsidiary of ContiGroup Companies of Belgium. A Wayne Farms plant in Albertville, Alabama continued production at reduced rates after the company disclosed that 75 workers had tested positive and one worker had died. On May 14, it was reported that "a small number" of COVID-19 cases were associated with a Wayne Farms plant in Dobson, North Carolina. Over 500 workers were employed at the plant.

== Impact on meat alternatives ==
The meat shortage increased sales and investor interest in plant-based meat alternative products from companies such as Impossible Foods, Beyond Meat, and Novameat. U.S. sales of meat alternatives were up 280% over 2019 for the week ending March 14, 2020; the following week, sales of fresh meat alternatives were up 454% over 2019. Black Enterprise reported in May 2020 that vegan food sales had soared during the pandemic.

The global market for alternative proteins was valued at US$14.1 billion in 2021 and is projected to grow at a CAGR of 3.7% to reach US$17.4 billion by 2027.

Factories that produce meat alternatives may be less vulnerable to disease outbreaks than meat processing plants, as meat alternatives rely more on machines and less on tightly packed employees.

== See also ==
- Impact of the COVID-19 pandemic on the meat industry in Canada
