= Freibergs =

Freibergs is a Latvian surname. Notable people with the surname include:

- Imants Freibergs (1934–2026), Latvian computer scientist, First Gentleman of Latvia (1999–2007)
- Kristers Freibergs (born 1992), Latvian ice hockey player
- Ralfs Freibergs (born 1991), Latvian ice hockey player

== See also ==
- Freiberg (disambiguation)
