= Freiberg (disambiguation) =

Freiberg is a town in Saxony, Germany.

Freiberg (German for "free mountain") may also refer to:

== Places ==
- Freiberg (district), Saxony, Germany
- Freiberg am Neckar, a town in Ludwigsburg, Baden-Württemberg, Germany
- Freiberg subcamp, a subcamp of Flossenbürg concentration camp in Freiberg, Saxony
- Freiberg in Moravia, a German exonym for Příbor, Czech Republic
- Freiberg in Bohemia, a German exonym for Příbram, Czech Republic

== People with the surname ==
- Arie Freiberg (born 1949), former Dean of Law at Monash University
- Ashley Freiberg (born 1991), American racing driver
- Charles A. Freiberg (1887–1941), New York politician
- David Freiberg (born 1938), American musician, vocalist, and bass guitar player,
- Julius Freiberg (1823–1905), German-American distillery owner
- Konrad Freiberg, former president of the Gewerkschaft der Polizei (German Police Union)
- Steffen Freiberg (born 1981), German politician
- Theodoric of Freiberg (c.1250–c.1310), theologian, philosopher and natural scientist

== See also ==
- Freiburg (disambiguation)
- Freiburg im Breisgau, the city in Baden-Württemberg, Germany
- Freibergs, a Latvian surname
- Freyberg, a surname
- Freyburg (disambiguation)
- Friberg, a surname
- Fribourg (disambiguation)
- Fribourg, the capital of the Swiss canton of Fribourg
