= Freyburg =

Freyburg may refer to:

Germany

- Freyburg, Germany

United States

- Freyburg, Ohio
- Freyburg, Texas

== See also ==
- Freiberg (disambiguation)
- Freiburg (disambiguation)
- Freyberg
- Friberg
- Fribourg (disambiguation)
- Fryeburg (disambiguation)
