= Fribourg (disambiguation) =

Fribourg may refer to:

== Places ==
- Fribourg, capital of the Canton of Fribourg, Switzerland
- Canton of Fribourg, Switzerland
- Fribourg, France, town in the Moselle département, France
- Fribourg en Brisgau, Germany, French name of Freiburg im Breisgau, located near the French-German border
- Nova Friburgo ("New Fribourg" in English), a Brazilian town named for the Swiss canton.

== People ==
- Fribourg (surname)

== See also ==
- Friberg
- Freiburg (disambiguation)
