= Paul J. Fribourg =

American businessman

- Born: 1954 or 1955 (age 71–72)
- Education: Amherst College
- Occupation: businessman
- Known for: sixth generation of the Fribourg family to lead Continental Grain
- Title: CEO, Continental Grain Company
- Term: 1976-
- Board member of: ContiGroup Companies; Estée Lauder; Burger King; Loews Corporation; Bunge
- Spouse: Josabeth Amar
- Children: 4
- Parent: Michel Fribourg
- Relatives: David Amar (father-in-law)

Paul J. Fribourg (born 1954/55) is an American businessman, the chairman and CEO of ContiGroup Companies, a global agribusiness and food company, since 1976. Continental Grain was founded by Simon Fribourg in Arlon, Belgium in 1813. He is the sixth generation of the Fribourg family to lead the company.

== Early life ==
Paul J. Fribourg is the son of Jewish-American businessman Michel Fribourg, chairman emeritus of Continental Grain, who died on April 10, 2001, and his wife Mary Ann. He has four siblings, brothers Robert and Charles, and sisters Nadine and Caroline.

He has a bachelor's degree in business administration and economics from Amherst College.

== Career ==
Fribourg has been the chairman and CEO of ContiGroup Companies since 1976.

He is a director of Estée Lauder, Restaurant Brands International, Syngenta, Bunge, Restaurant Technologies and Loews Corporation.

Fribourg is a member of the Council on Foreign Relations.

== Personal life ==
In 2012, Fribourg spent $27.2 million on a 5-bedroom, 5-bathroom apartment on New York's Fifth Avenue, previously owned by Bruce Fiedorek, the former vice chair of Morgan Stanley.
