= Sanderson Farms =

American food and agriculture company

Sanderson Farms, Inc.
- Company type: Subsidiary
- Traded as: Nasdaq: SAFM
- Industry: Poultry farming
- Founded: 1947; 79 years ago, incorporated 1955; 71 years ago
- Founder: D.R. "Bob" Sanderson, Sr.
- Headquarters: Laurel, Mississippi, U.S.
- Key people: Joe F. Sanderson, Jr. (CEO and Chairman of the Board); Lampkin Butts (President, COO, and Board Member); Mike Cockrell (CFO, CLO, Treasurer, and Board Member); Tim Rigley (CAO and Secretary)
- Revenue: US$3.4 billion (2019)
- Owners: Wayne-Sanderson Farms (2022–present)
- Number of employees: 17,662 (October 31, 2021)
- Website: sandersonfarms.com

Sanderson Farms is an American poultry producer which is based in Laurel, Mississippi. It is the third largest poultry producer in the United States and produces 13.65 million chickens per week.

On July 22, 2022, it merged with Wayne Farms to form Wayne-Sanderson Farms. The new company is controlled by a joint venture between Cargill and Conti (also known as Continental Grain Co. or ContiGroup).

In 2021, it was included in the Fortune 500 list.

== History ==
The company was founded in 1947 by D.R. Sanderson, Sr.

In 1961, the company merged with Miss Goldy’s Chicken company.

In 1987, it became a publicly listed company.

In 2020, the company made more than $3.5 billion, processing more than 4.8 billion pounds of meat. In 2021, the company employed more than 17,000 people.

In August 2021, it was announced that Sanderson Farms was sold to global food corporation Cargill, in a joint venture with Continental Grain Co. for $4.5 billion. The sale will combine Sanderson Farms with Continental subsidiary Wayne Farms to create a new, privately held chicken production company.

In March 2022, the finalization of the sale was uncertain due to the investigations from the United States Department of Justice; but on July 22, 2022, Wayne Farms merged with Sanderson Farms to form Wayne-Sanderson Farms.

== Plants ==
- Mississippi
- Louisiana
- Texas
- Georgia
- North Carolina
