= Louise Friberg =

Louise Friberg may refer to:

- Louise Edlind Friberg (born 1946), Swedish actress and politician
- Louise Friberg (golfer) (born 1980), Swedish golfer
