= Erik Friberg =

Erik Friberg is the name of:

- Erik Friberg (footballer) (born 1986), Swedish footballer
- Erik Friberg (poker player) (born 1983), Swedish poker player
