= Monte Carlo, Santa Catarina =

Monte Carlo
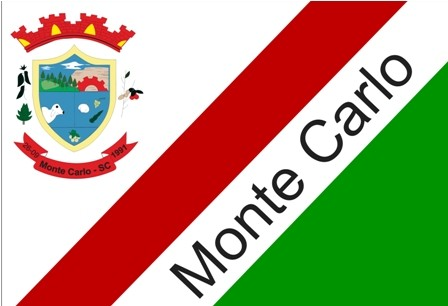
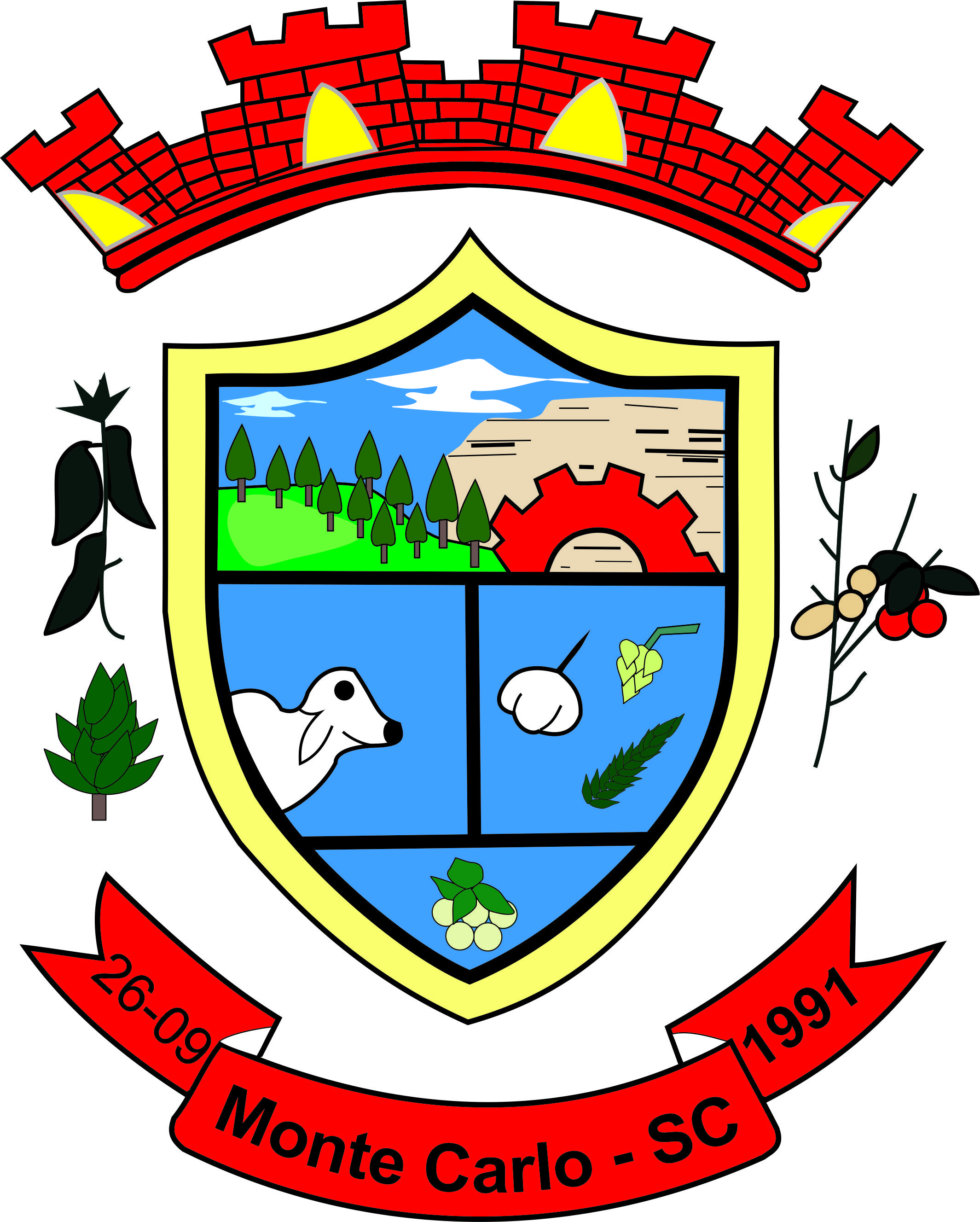
- Flag Coat of arms

- Location of Monte Carlo

- Location within Brazil
- Coordinates: 27°13′22″S 50°58′47″W
- Country: Brazil
- Region: South
- State: (Santa Catarina (state)) Santa Catarina
- Founded: September 26, 1991

Government
  - Mayor: Antoninho Tibúrcio Gonçalves (PMDB)

Area
  - Total: 162.785 km^{2} (62.852 sq mi)
- Elevation: 942 m (3,091 ft)

Population (2020)
  - Total: 9,906
  - Density: 66.8/km^{2} (173/sq mi)
- Time zone: UTC-3 (UTC-3)
  - Summer (DST): UTC-2 (UTC-2)
- HDI (2000): 0.733
- Website: www.montecarlo.sc.gov.br

Monte Carlo is a city in Santa Catarina, in the Southern Region of Brazil. It is part of the metropolitan region of the city of Fraiburgo.

== Climate ==
Monte Carlo has a oceanic climate (Köppen climate classification: Cfb), the temperature varies from 2°C to 31°C and is rarely lower than -3°C or higher than 35°C. Frosts are common on winter.

== See also ==
- List of municipalities in Santa Catarina
