= Rio das Antas =

Coordinates: 26.8986°S 51.0744°W

- Municipality
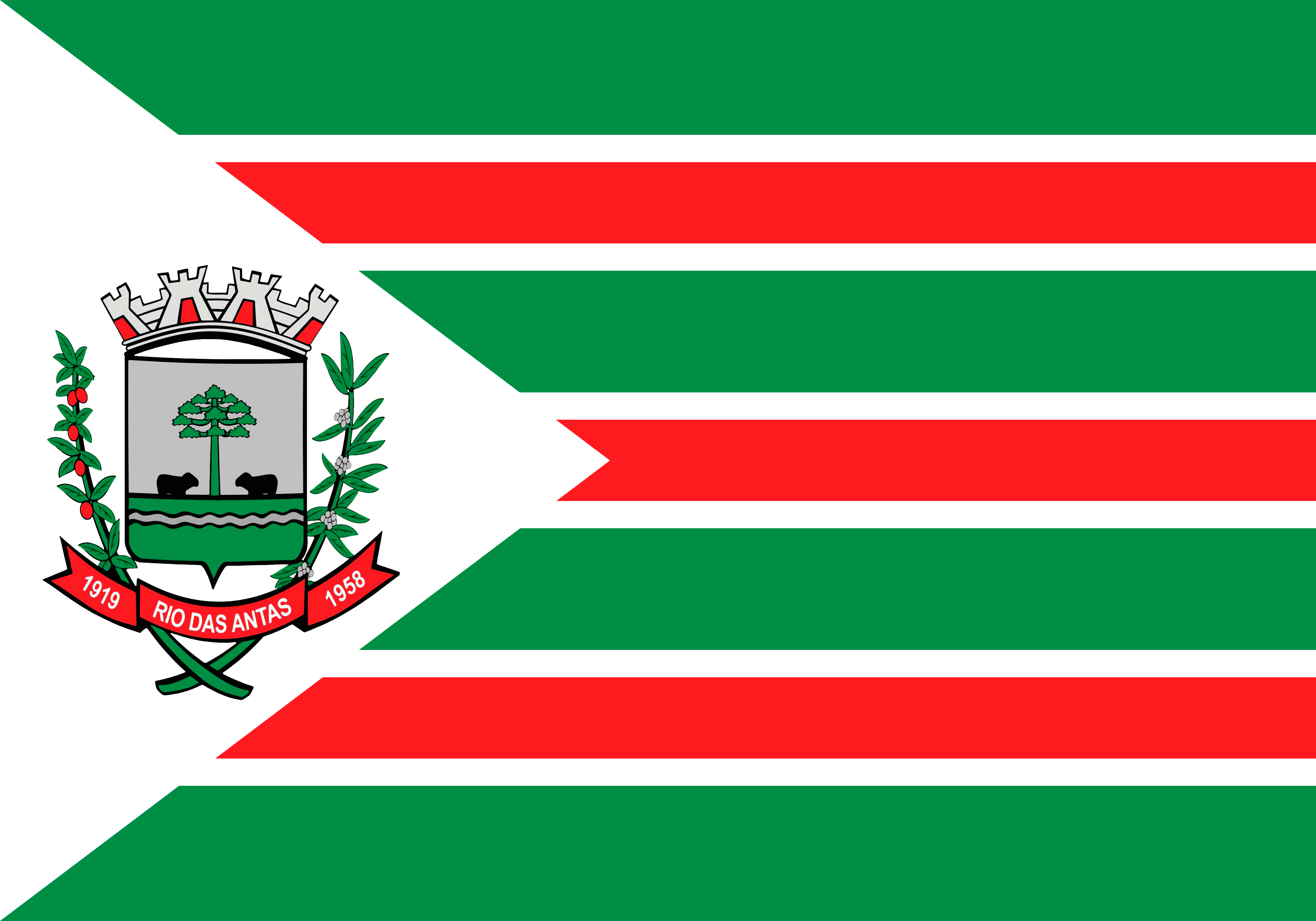
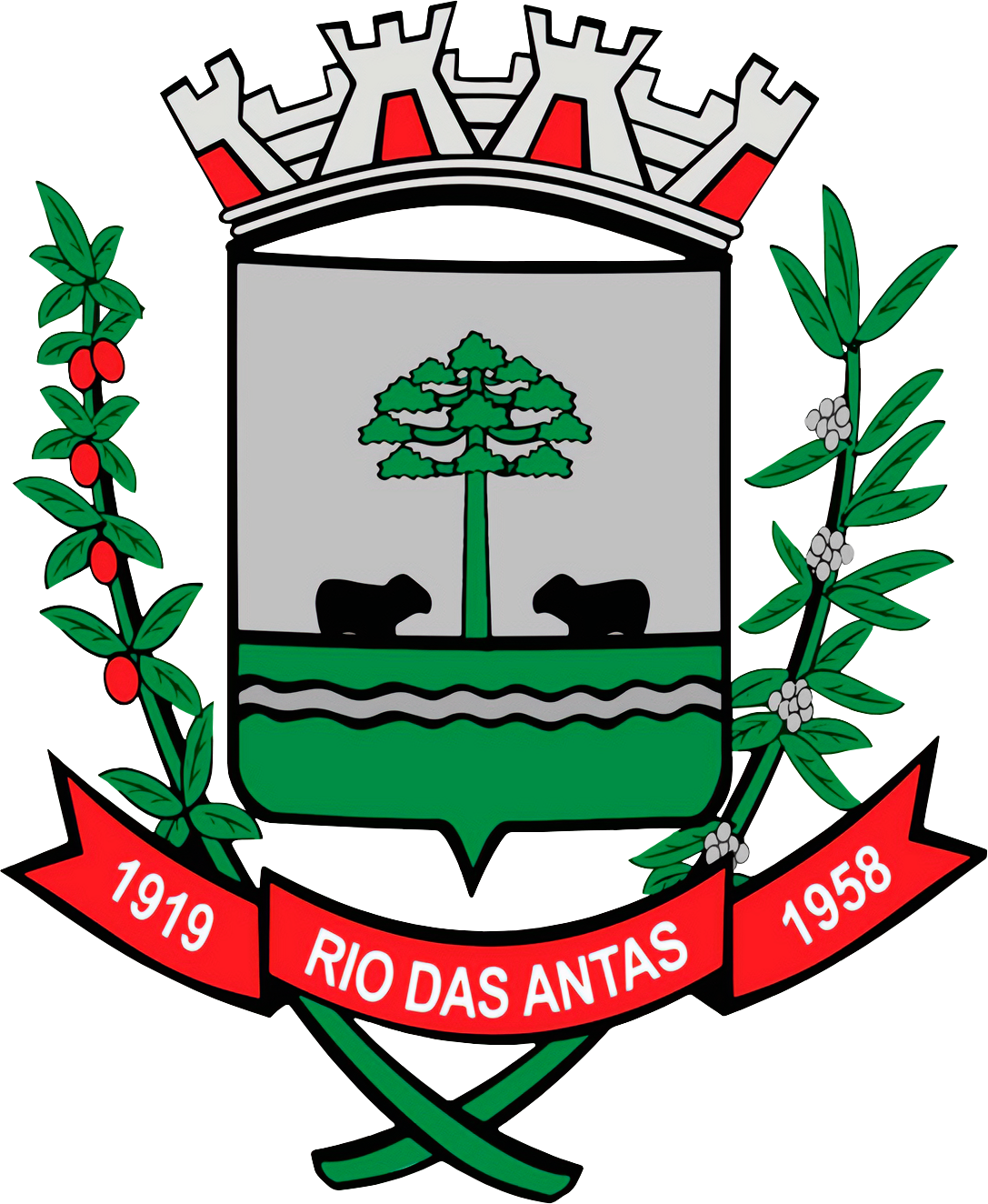
- Flag Coat of arms
- Interactive map of Rio das Antas
- Country: Brazil
- Region: South
- State: Santa Catarina
- Mesoregion: Oeste Catarinense

Population (2020)
  - Total: 6,202
- Time zone: UTC -3
- Website: www.riodasantas.sc.gov.br

Rio das Antas is a municipality in the state of Santa Catarina in the South region of Brazil.

== See also ==
- List of municipalities in Santa Catarina
