= Michel Fribourg =

American businessman (1913-2001)

- Born: 11 August 1913; Antwerp, Belgium
- Died: April 10 2001 (aged 87–88); New York City, US
- Occupation: Businessman
- Title: Chairman and CEO of Continental Grain
- Spouse: Mary Ann
- Children: 5, including Paul
- Father: Jules Fribourg

Michel Pierre Fribourg (August 11, 1913 – April 10, 2001) was an American billionaire businessman, the chairman and CEO of Continental Grain, a global agribusiness and food company founded by Simon Fribourg in Arlon, Belgium in 1813. In his New York Times obituary, he was called "certainly the premier figure in world trade in food of the 20th century".

== Early life ==
Son of Jules Fribourg and Lucienne Brunschwig, Michel P. Fribourg was born in Antwerp and educated in France.

== Career ==
He worked all of his life for Continental Grain a company owned by his family, rising to chairman and CEO.

In 1944, following the death of his father, he became the fifth generation of Fribourgs to lead Continental Grain.

In 1998, Forbes estimated his net worth at $2.4 billion, based on his ownership of Continental Grain and 75% of ContiFinancial.

== Personal life ==
He was married to Mary Ann.

They had five children, sons Robert Fribourg, Paul J. Fribourg, Charles Fribourg, Nadine Newman and Caroline Rosen.

He died in New York on April 10, 2001.
