= Frei Rogério =

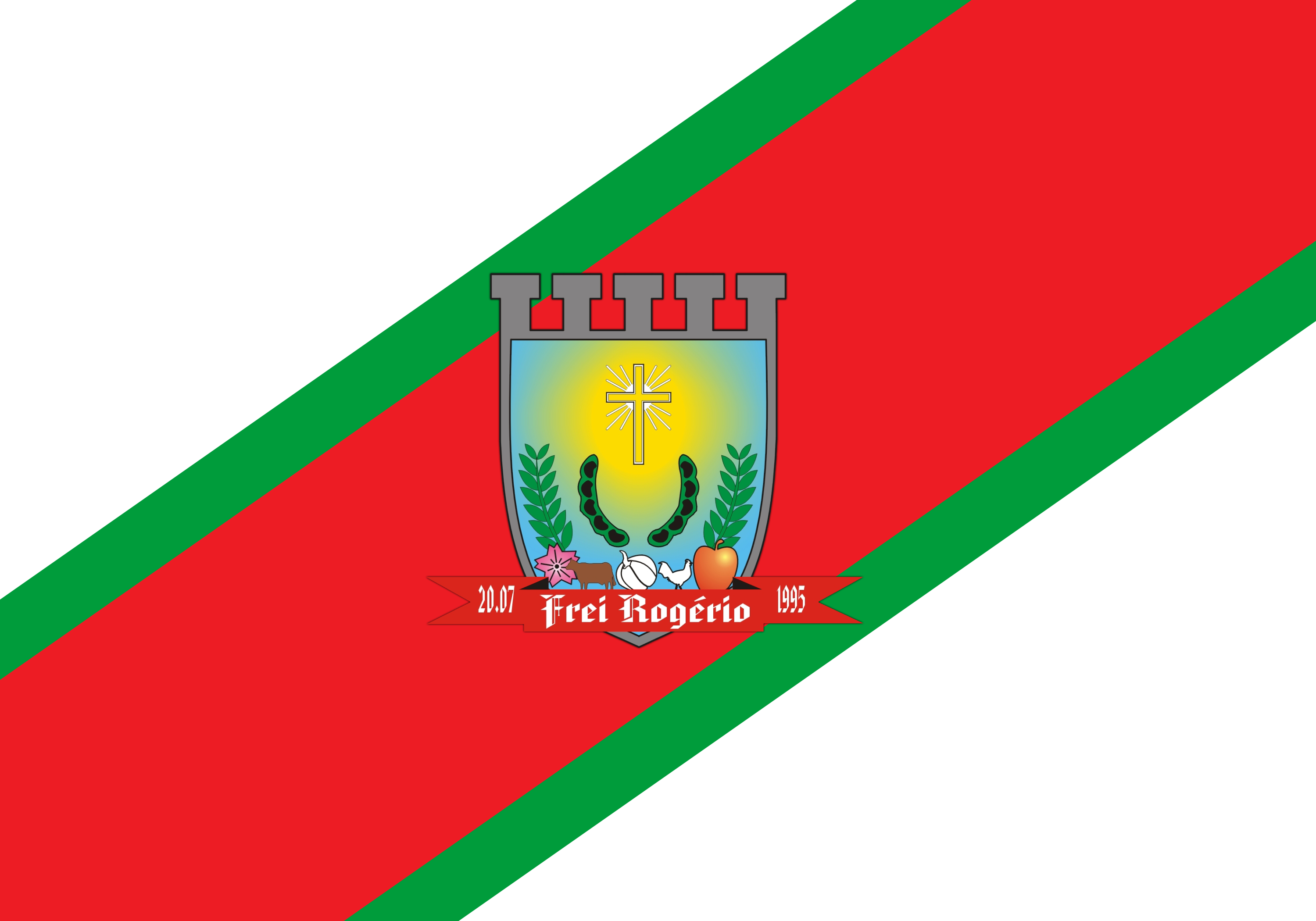
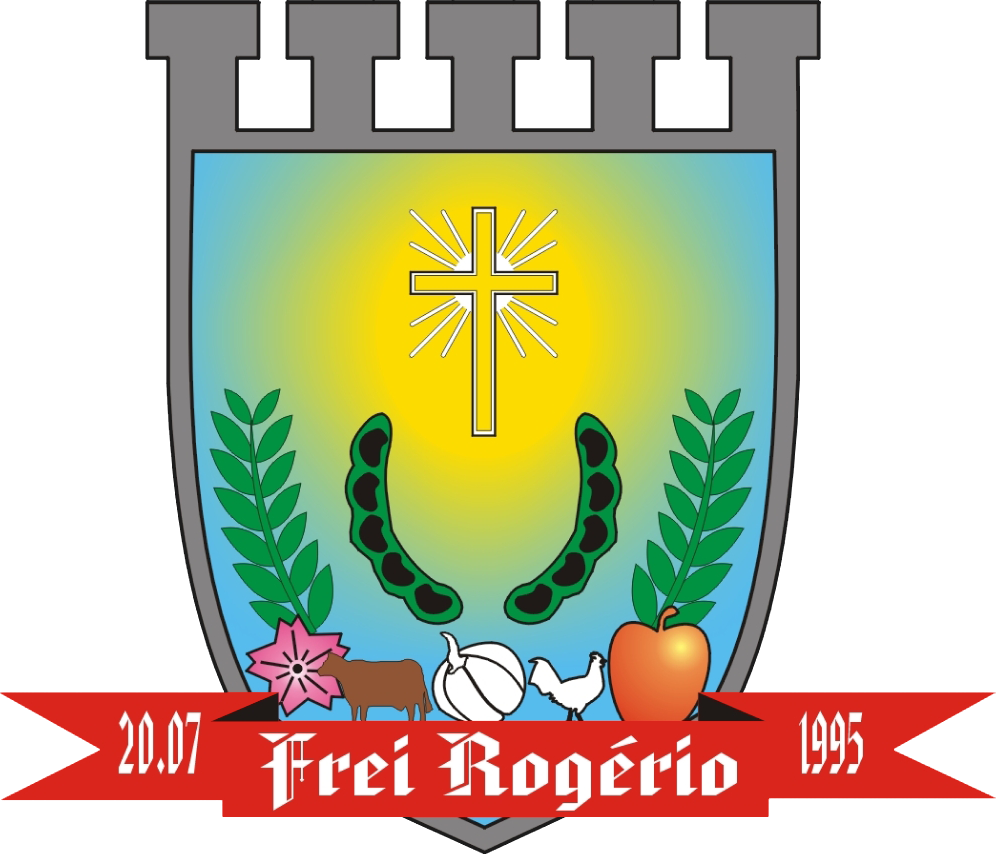
- Flag Coat of arms

- Location of Frei Rogério

- Location within Brazil
- Coordinates: 27°10′30″S 50°48′18″W
- Country: Brazil
- Region: South
- State: (Santa Catarina (state)) Santa Catarina
- Founded: July 20, 1995

Government
  - Mayor: Antonio Moacir Darol

Area
  - Total: 157.845 km^{2} (60.944 sq mi)
- Elevation: 950 m (3,120 ft)

Population (2020)
  - Total: 1,970
  - Density: 20.7/km^{2} (54/sq mi)
- Time zone: UTC-3 (UTC-3)
  - Summer (DST): UTC-2 (UTC-2)
- HDI (2000): 0.740
- Website: www.freirogerio.sc.gov.br

Frei Rogério is a city in Santa Catarina, in the Southern Region of Brazil.
