= Scheibel =

Scheibel is German surname:

- Arnold Scheibel (1923–2017), American neuroscientist
- Gottfried Ephraim Scheibel (1696–1759), German theologian and writer about music
- James Scheibel (born 1947), American politician
- Johann Gottfried Scheibel (1783–1843), a German Lutheran leader
- Markus Scheibel (born 1964, in Schönebeck (Elbe)), German footballer
- Oskar Scheibel (1881–1953), German beetle collector

== Scheibl ==
- Eligius Scheibl, Austrian politician
- Hubert Scheibl (born 1952, Gmunden), Austrian painter

== Schaible ==
- Alexander Schaible (1870, Freiburg im Breisgau - 1933), German civil servant
- Grace Berg Schaible, née Berg (1925, Tacoma, Washington), the first female state's attorney general
- Ivo Schaible (1912, Laupheim - 1990), German religious leader and artist
