= Untersulmetingen Castle =

- Schloss Untersulmetingen
- Laupheim-Untersulmetingen
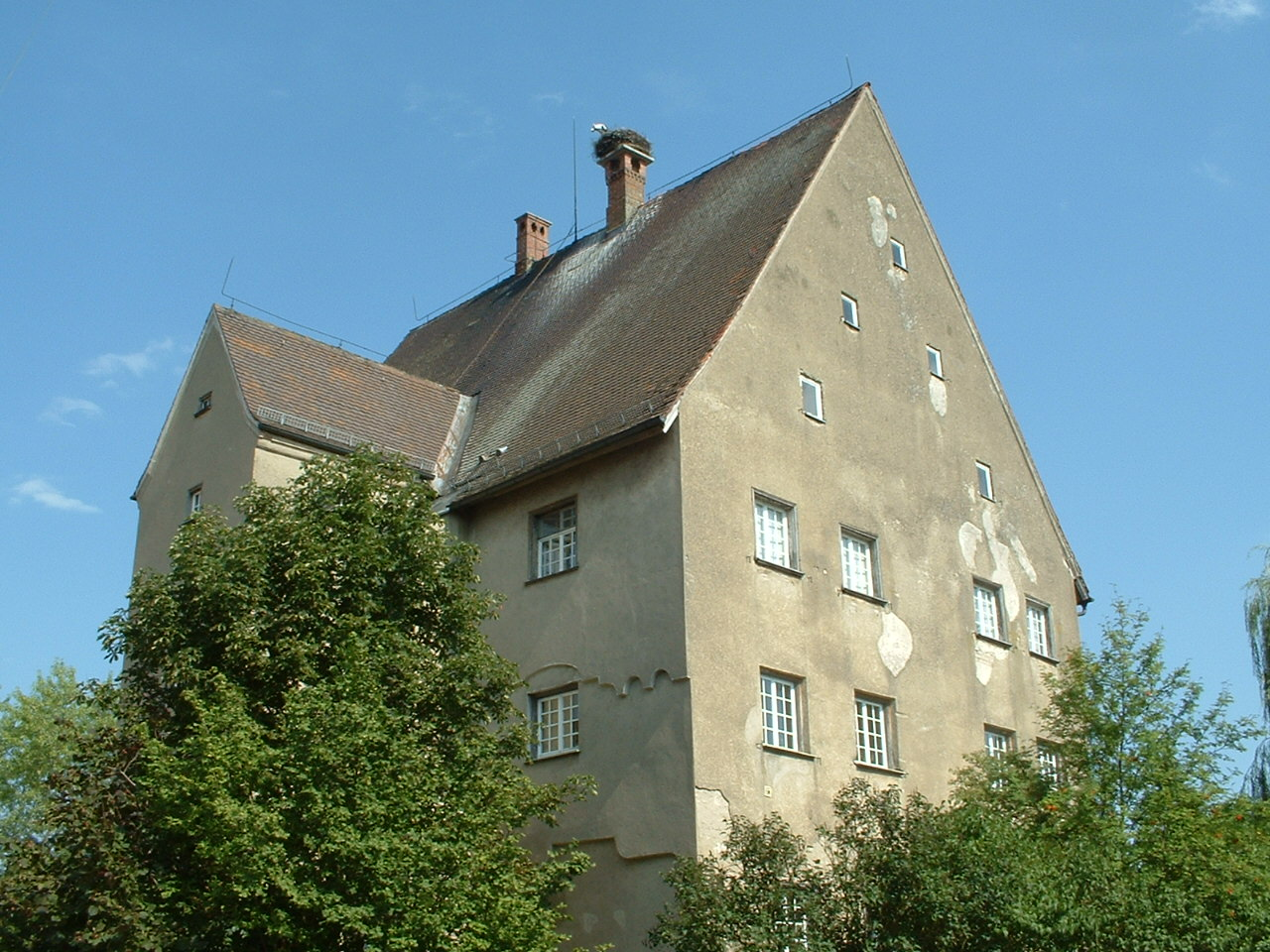

Site information
- Code: DE-BW
- Open to the public: No

Location
- Coordinates: 48.13484°N 9.49429°E
- Height: 509 m above sea level (NN)

Site history
- Built: 1538-1542

Garrison information
- Occupants: Private

Untersulmetingen Castle is a small castle-like renaissance structure in the village of Untersulmetingen, now part of the municipality of Laupheim, in the state of Baden-Württemberg, Germany.

== Location ==
The castle is situated at an elevation of 509 metres in the centre of the formerly independent village of Untersulmetingen. It is located on a slow slope of a terminal moraine to the west of the river Riß.

== Appearance ==
Untersulmetingen Castle is a plain, three-storey building, covered by a large gabled roof which dates from around 1600.

The castle chapel, which dates from 1608 and was dedicated to Saint Othmar, is decorated by paintings and stucco whose function it is to amalgamate the encompassed forms of the windows and paintings into a moving form.

== History ==
A medieval castle was built around 1400. In March 1525 this castle was looted and burnt down by the Baltringer Haufen during the German Peasants' War. On the death of Georg von Sulmetingen in 1528, the indigenous local nobility became extinct, after which the castle and the village repeatedly changed hands. Between 1538 and 1542, Hieronymus Roth von Schreckenstein, a patrician from Ulm, had a new castle built on the foundations of the previous one, destroyed during the Peasants' War.

In 1551 Untersulmetingen Castle was acquired by Johann Jakob Fugger. His successors altered the castle fundamentally. Around 1600, the gabled roof was constructed. In 1608, Trajan Fugger added a Rococo-style chapel to the castle. He invested a large sum to embellish the castle itself and its precinct, erecting a gatehouse, a castle garden, a tithe barn and several economy buildings. In 1729, the castle was mortgaged to Ochsenhausen Abbey which ultimately bought the castle in 1735.

Between 1730 and 1732, Benedikt Denzel, abbot of Ochsenhausen Abbey, redesigned the interior of Untersulmetingen Castle as well as the castles' chapel, employing prestigious artists such as sculptor Dominikus Hermenegild Herberger and painter Franz Joseph Spiegler.

In 1803, after the dissolution of the monasteries during the secularisation, the castle went into the hands of Georg Karl von Metternich-Winneburg und Beilstein as compensation for territories lost to France following Napoleon's conquests. In 1805 he sold the castle to Karl Anselm von Thurn und Taxis. In December 1805 the village passed into the possession of the Kingdom of Bavaria and in 1806 it was assigned to the Kingdom of Württemberg. Karl Anselm von Thurn und Taxis remained lord of the castle until the feudal tenure was abolished later on. From that time the castle was allocated to the local priest who used it as his residence until 1969, when it was sold into private hands.

In 1979 and in 2000, the castle chapel was renovated.

== Current use ==
Today the castle is privately owned. The chapel is home of the local administration.

A stork's nest is situated on top of one of the chimneys.

== See also ==
- List of castles in Baden-Württemberg
