= Franz Pfender =

German politician (1899–1972)

Member of the Bundestag
- In office 7 September 1949 – 7 September 1953

Personal details
- Born: 5 August 1899 Untersulmetingen, Kingdom of Württemberg, German Empire
- Died: 9 July 1972 (aged 72) Laupheim, West Germany
- Party: CDU
- Children: 4

Franz Pfender (August 5, 1899 – July 9, 1972) was a German politician of the Centre Party and the Christian Democratic Union (CDU) and a member of the German Bundestag.

== Life ==
After attended Volksschule, Pfender served as a soldier in World War I from 1917 to 1918. In 1921, he became a member of a Catholic workers' association in Württemberg. From 1922, he worked as a full-time official for the Christian trade unions in Württemberg and, in 1924, he moved to the Province of Upper Silesia working in the same capacity. From 1926 to 1933, he was a member of the Upper Silesian provincial parliament for the Centre Party.

After the Nazi seizure of power in 1933, Pfender was forced to relinquish his political and trade union positions. He lived in Silesia during the following years and worked as a district manager for a life insurance company. From 1939 to 1945, he served as a soldier in World War II until he was captured as a prisoner of war.

After the end of the war, Pfender returned to politics and became a member of the Landtag (state parliament) for Württemberg-Hohenzollern from 1946 to 1952. At the federal elections in 1949, he entered the first German Bundestag via the state list of the Christian Democratic Union (CDU) Württemberg-Hohenzollern, of which he was a member until 1953. In the Bundestag, he was a member of the Committee for Reconstruction and Housing, the Committee for Homeland Displacement and the Committee for Internal Restructuring.

== Sources ==
- Habel, Walter (Ed.): Wer ist wer? Das deutsche Who's who. 11. Ausgabe. Arani, Berlin 1951, p. 489.
- Herbst, Ludolf; Jahn, Bruno (2002). Vierhaus, Rudolf (ed.). Biographisches Handbuch der Mitglieder des Deutschen Bundestages. 1949–2002 [Biographical Handbook of the Members of the German Bundestag. 1949–2002] (in German). München: De Gruyter - De Gruyter Saur. p. 1715. ISBN 978-3-11-184511-1.
