= Schaible =

Schaible is a surname. Notable people with the surname include:

- Donald Schaible (born 1957), American politician
- Grace Berg Schaible (1925–2017), American lawyer and politician
- Ivo Schaible (1912–1990), German Catholic priest and artist
- T. Schaible (born1969), American Cryptogram Puzzle Book Author
