= Ivo Gönner =

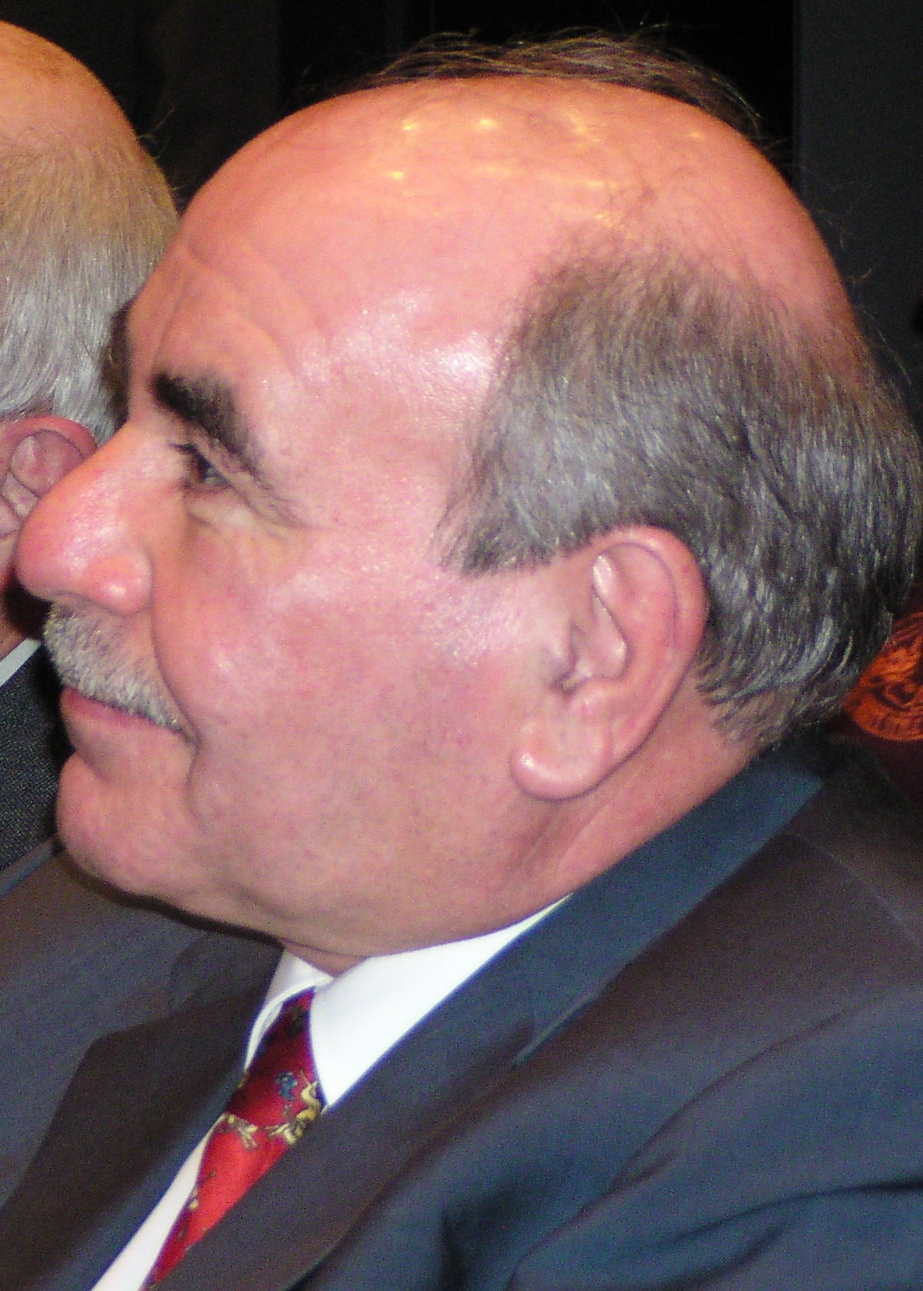
Ivo Gönner

Ivo Gönner (born 18 February 1952 in Laupheim) is a member of the Social Democratic Party of Germany (SPD) and was Lord Mayor of Ulm from 1992 until 29 February 2016.

His father was a pharmacist. He grew up in Laupheim, studied jurisprudence in Heidelberg and worked as a lawyer until 1992 when he became Lord Mayor of Ulm, succeeding Ernst Ludwig (CDU). In 1999 und 2007 he was re-elected. On 29 February 2016 he gave his position to Gunter Czisch (CDU). On 23 April 2016 he received from Minister-president Winfried Kretschmann the Order of Merit of Baden-Württemberg. He is married to the journalist Susanne Schwarzkopf-Gönner and has two children.
