= Johann Georg Specht =

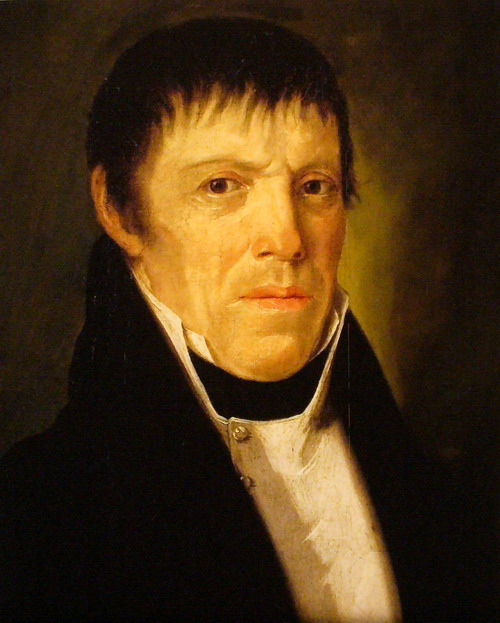
Johann Georg Specht ca. 1770

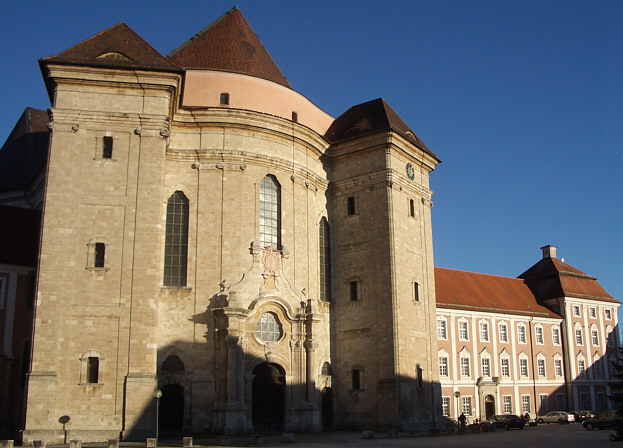
Wiblingen Abbey, church

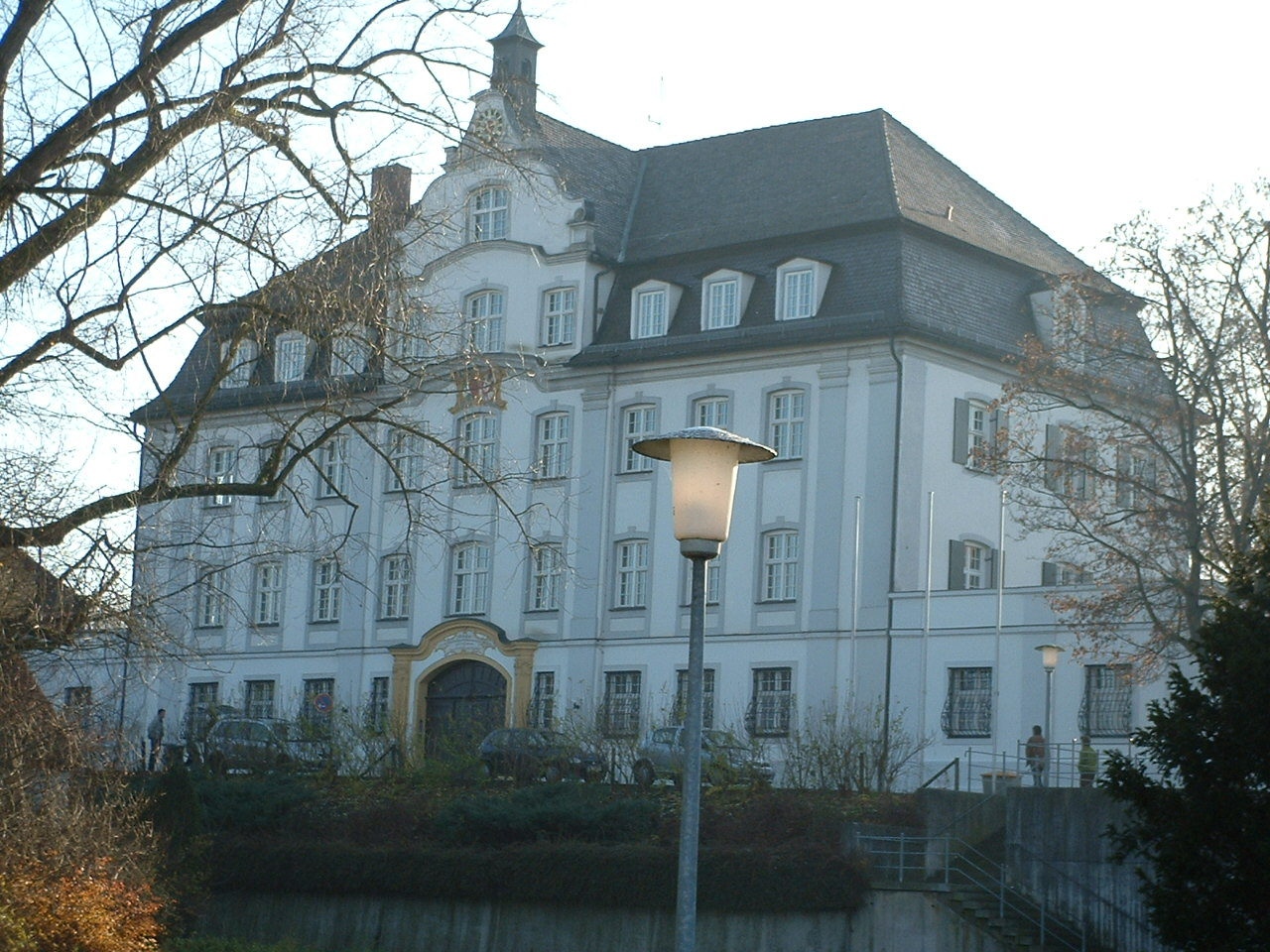
Castle Kleinlaupheim

Johann Georg Specht (20 December 1721 – 30 December 1803) was born in Lindenberg im Allgäu. He was a civil engineer and architect in the south of Germany.

Johann Georg Specht trained as a civil engineer with Peter Thumb in Vorarlberg.

Specht planned and had a vast number of edifices and other constructions built in Upper Swabia and the Allgäu, amongst which are as varied constructions as water works, bridges, mills, residential buildings, industrial buildings and even castles and churches.

His main and most famous project was the monastery church St. Martin at Wiblingen Abbey in 1771. He planned and designed the church but was not allowed to execute the building works when the Bavarian painter and civil engineer Januarius Zick was contracted in 1778 to complete the building works after Specht had been dismissed in December 1777.

== Works ==
- 1748–1750: industrial building at castle Ratzenried
- 1751: parish church in Eglofs
- 1753: parish church in Baisingen near Nagold
- 1754: castle Amtzell
- 1855–1756: hunting castle and chapel St Leonard in Rimpach near Leutkirch
- 1765: extension of the parish church in Lindenberg/Allgäu
- 1771: parish church in Wiggensbach near Kempten/Allgäu
- 1771-1778: church at Wiblingen Abbey
- 1776-1779: castle Kleinlaupheim in Laupheim
- 1778: mail coach station in Kempten/Allgäu
- 1782: industrial buildings at Irsee Monastery
- 1786-1789: castle Neutrauchberg near Isny
- 1792: parish church in Scheidegg near Lindenberg im Allgäu

== Honour ==
A street in Lindenberg im Allgäu has been named Baumeister-Specht-Strasse.
