= 7167 Laupheim =

Dark background asteroid

Discovery
- Discovered by: C. S. Shoemaker; E. M. Shoemaker
- Discovery site: Palomar Obs.
- Discovery date: 12 October 1985

Designations
- Named after: Laupheim Observatory (Robert Clausen and team)
- Alternative designations: 1985 TD_{3} · 1991 VR_{4}
- Minor planet category: main-belt · (outer) background

Orbital characteristics
- Epoch 23 March 2018 (JD 2458200.5)
- Uncertainty parameter 0
- Observation arc: 32.04 yr (11,702 d)
- Aphelion: 3.7768 AU
- Perihelion: 2.4740 AU
- Semi-major axis: 3.1254 AU
- Eccentricity: 0.2084
- Orbital period (sidereal): 5.53 yr (2,018 d)
- Mean anomaly: 280.23°
- Mean motion: 0° 10^{m} 42.24^{s} / day
- Inclination: 23.495°
- Longitude of ascending node: 219.57°
- Argument of perihelion: 181.55°
- T_{Jupiter}: 3.0550

Physical characteristics
- Mean diameter: 17.86 km (calculated); 17.95±5.00 km 20.03±0.78 km 23.229±0.258 km
- Synodic rotation period: 7.040±0.0040 h
- Geometric albedo: 0.057±0.011; 0.057 (assumed); 0.058±0.005; 0.08±0.06
- Spectral type: C (assumed)
- Absolute magnitude (H): 11.9; 12.00; 12.019±0.002 (R); 12.1; 12.23±0.23; 12.30; 12.47

7167 Laupheim, provisional designation 1985 TD_{3}, is a dark background asteroid from the outer regions of the asteroid belt, approximately 20 kilometers (12 miles) in diameter. It was discovered on 12 October 1985, by American astronomers Carolyn and Eugene Shoemaker at the Palomar Observatory in California. The presumed C-type asteroid has a rotation period of 7.04 hours and was named for Robert Clausen and his team at the public Laupheim Observatory in Germany.

== Orbit and classification ==
Laupheim is a non-family asteroid from the main belt's background population. It orbits the Sun in the outer main-belt at a distance of 2.5–3.8 AU once every 5 years and 6 months (2,018 days; semi-major axis of 3.13 AU). Its orbit has an eccentricity of 0.21 and an inclination of 23° with respect to the ecliptic. The body's observation arc begins at Palomar in September 1985, about a month before its official discovery observation.

== Physical characteristics ==
Laupheim is an assumed carbonaceous C-type asteroid.

=== Rotation period ===
In October 2013, a rotational lightcurve of Laupheim was obtained from photometric observations by astronomers at the Palomar Transient Factory in California. Lightcurve analysis gave a rotation period of 7.040 hours with a brightness amplitude of 0.31 magnitude (U=2).

=== Diameter and albedo ===
According to the surveys carried out by the Japanese Akari satellite and the NEOWISE mission of NASA's Wide-field Infrared Survey Explorer, Laupheim measures between 17.95 and 23.229 kilometers in diameter and its surface has an albedo between 0.057 and 0.08.

The Collaborative Asteroid Lightcurve Link assumes a standard albedo for a carbonaceous asteroid of 0.057 and calculates a diameter of 17.86 kilometers based on an absolute magnitude of 12.47.

== Naming ==
This minor planet was named for Robert Clausen (born 1951) and his team at the public Laupheim Observatory (German: Volksternwarte Laupheim) in Laupheim, southern Germany. It was named by the discoverer Carolyn Shoemaker who visited the observatory in 1998. Clausen founded an association of amateur astronomers in 1975 which organized traveling astronomical exhibitions and numerous international astronomy festivals. Since 1990, he and his co-workers have also been running a Zeiss planetarium.

The official naming citation was published by the Minor Planet Center on 4 May 1999 (M.P.C. 34625).
