= Ludwig von Welden =

Austrian noble (1782–1853)

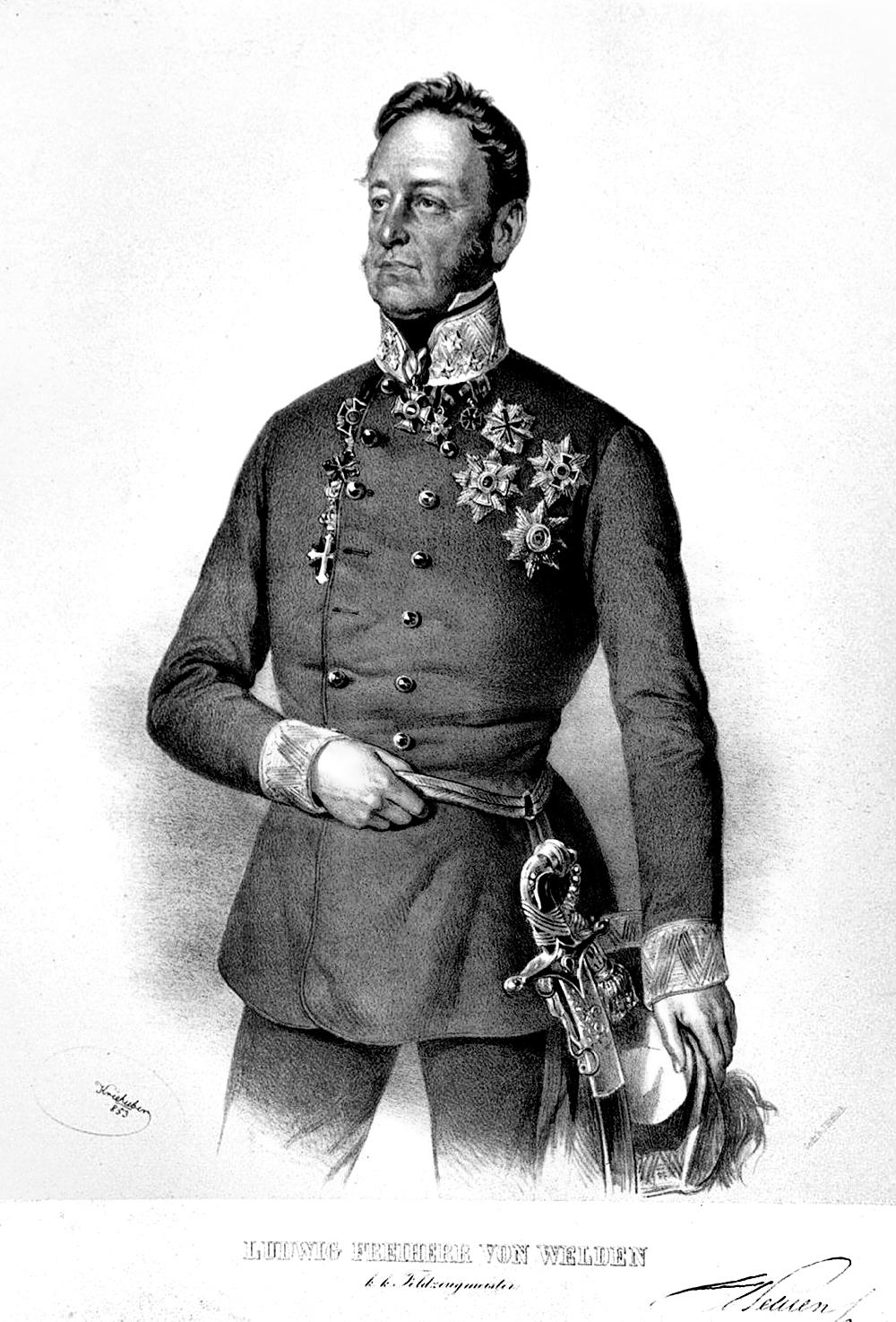
- Ludwig von Welden. Lithograph by Josef Kriehuber
- Born: 16 June 1780; Laupheim
- Died: 7 August 1853 (aged 73); Graz
- Military career
- Allegiance: Württemberg, Austrian Empire
- Service years: 1798–1851
- Rank: Feldzeugmeister

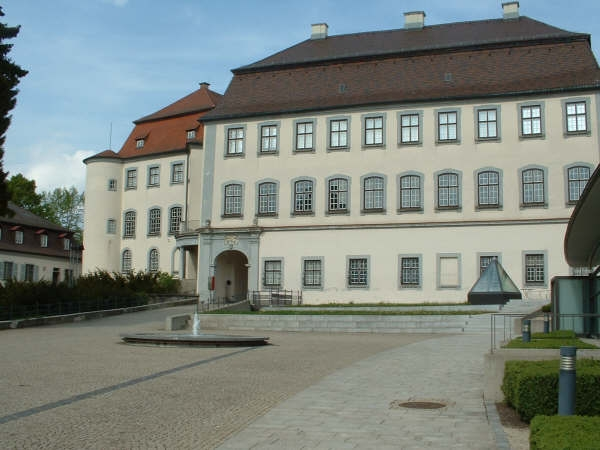
Großlaupheim Castle, birthplace of Ludwig von Welden

Franz Ludwig Baron von Welden (16 June 1780, Laupheim – 7 August 1853, Graz) was an Austrian army officer whose career culminated in becoming the commander-in-chief of the Austrian artillery.

Born in Laupheim, Ludwig von Welden joined the army of the Duchy of Württemberg in 1798, taking part in the war against revolutionary France 1799–1800. In 1802, he took service with Austria and became a French prisoner of war in 1809. Following a prisoner exchange, he then took part in the Battle of Aspern-Essling as a major in the Austrian army.

In 1812, he became part of the general staff at the headquarters of Prince Schwarzenberg. Having been promoted to the rank of lieutenant colonel, Ludwig von Welden served with distinction as a staff officer in Italy in 1814, and, after the capture of Mantua, was given the task to repatriate the French army, which had capitulated there, to southern France. In 1815, Ludwig von Welden was an officer in the general staff in the army raised to confront Joachim Murat, the dethroned king of Naples. During this campaign, he was promoted to the rank of colonel and, in 1816, to that of brigadier of the Austrian engineer corps.

Following this, Ludwig von Welden became head of the army topographical office, and served during the campaign in Piedmont in 1821 as head of the general staff. He also supervised the topographical survey of the region. In 1824, he published a monography about the Monte Rosa.

From 1832 until 1838, he was a delegate at the central military commission of the German Confederation in Frankfurt. Having been promoted to the rank of lieutenant field marshal, he took command of a division in Graz in 1838, and, in 1843, assumed the general command of Tyrol. During the uprising of Lombardy in 1848, he managed to secure General Radetzky's lines of communication to Austria and was then put in charge of the confinement of Venice.

In September 1848, Ludwig van Welden was appointed governor of Dalmatia, having military as well civil powers. He also served in the same capacity in Vienna after it was reconquered by imperial troops during the course of the revolution of 1848.

After the Prince of Windischgrätz's failure to suppress the revolutionary movements in the Hungarian Revolution of 1848, Ludwig van Welden was given the supreme command of the Austrian army in Hungary in April 1849. However, after the Hungarian conquest of Ofen in May, he was replaced by Julius Jacob von Haynau and returned to Vienna to resume his post as governor, having also been promoted to the second highest rank in the Austrian army, Feldzeugmeister.

Due to his failing health, Ludwig von Welden retired from active military service in 1851, and died in Graz in 1853.

Ludwig von Welden was also a keen botanist and member of the Regensburg Botanical Society. He bequeathed his herbarium of 20,000 specimens from Europe and Africa to the society.

== See also ==
- Napoleonic Wars
- Revolutions of 1848 in the Austrian Empire
- Hungarian Revolution of 1848
