= Sepp Uhlmann =

German fencer

Personal information
- Full name: Josef "Sepp" Uhlmann
- Born: 21 October 1902 Laupheim, Germany
- Died: 20 July 1968 (aged 65) Laupheim, Germany

Sport
- Sport: Fencing

Josef "Sepp" Uhlmann (21 October 1902 – 20 July 1968) was a German fencer. He competed in the team épée event at the 1936 Summer Olympics.
