= Laupheim =

- Town
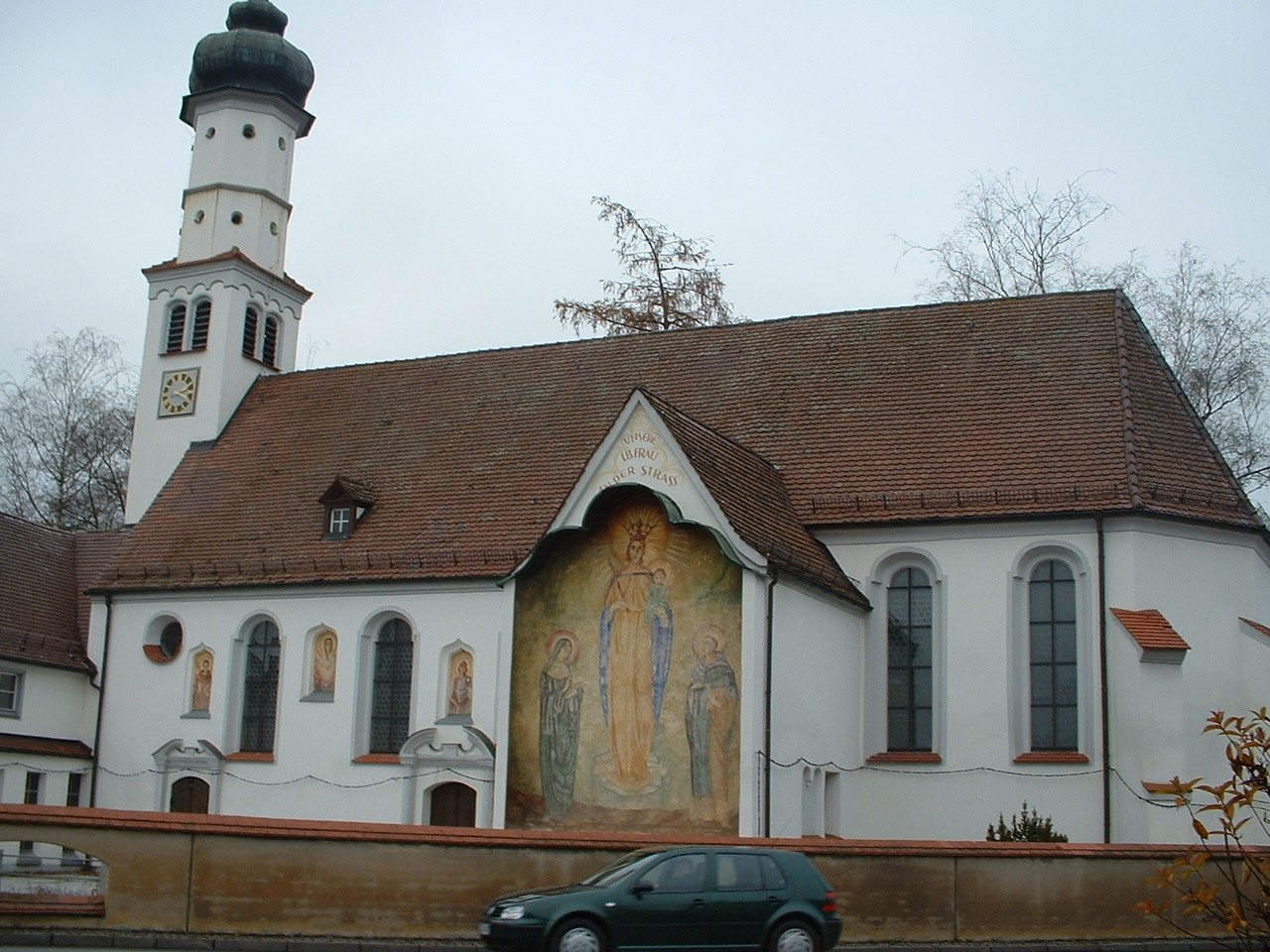
- Chapel of St Leonhard

- Coat of arms

- Location of Laupheim within Biberach district
- Interactive map of Laupheim
- Location within Germany Location within Baden-Württemberg
- Coordinates: 48°13′44″N 9°52′47″E
- Country: Germany
- State: Baden-Württemberg
- Admin. region: Tübingen
- District: Biberach
- Subdivisions: 5

Government
  - Mayor (2022–30): Ingo Bergmann (SPD)

Area
  - Total: 61.79 km^{2} (23.86 sq mi)
- Elevation: 528 m (1,732 ft)

Population (2025-12-31)
  - Total: 22,836
  - Density: 369.6/km^{2} (957.2/sq mi)
- Time zone: UTC+01:00 (CET)
  - Summer (DST): UTC+02:00 (CEST)
- Postal codes: 88471
- Dialling codes: 07392
- Vehicle registration: BC
- Website: www.laupheim.de

Laupheim (German: [ˈlaʊphaɪm]; Swabian: Laoba) is a major district town in southern Germany in the state of Baden-Württemberg. Laupheim was first mentioned in 778 and gained city rights in 1869. One of the main trading routes, from Ulm to Ravensburg and then on towards Lake Constance ran through Laupheim. Having developed from a rural settlement into a small urban area, Laupheim is home to a number of small to medium-sized industries and businesses. One of the largest employers are the German Armed Forces which maintain an airbase close to Laupheim, Laupheim Air Base.

Laupheim was the administrative centre of the district of Laupheim from 1842 until 1938 when the district was abolished. The southern parts of it were incorporated into the district of Biberach (including Laupheim itself) whereas the remainders were allocated to the district of Ulm.

In the second half of the 19th century Laupheim was home to the largest Jewish community in the Kingdom of Württemberg.

After World War II, Laupheim became part of the French occupation zone in 1945 and became part of the newly founded state of Württemberg-Hohenzollern in 1947.

Laupheim is the educational centre for the surrounding rural areas particularly with regard to secondary education.

== Geography ==
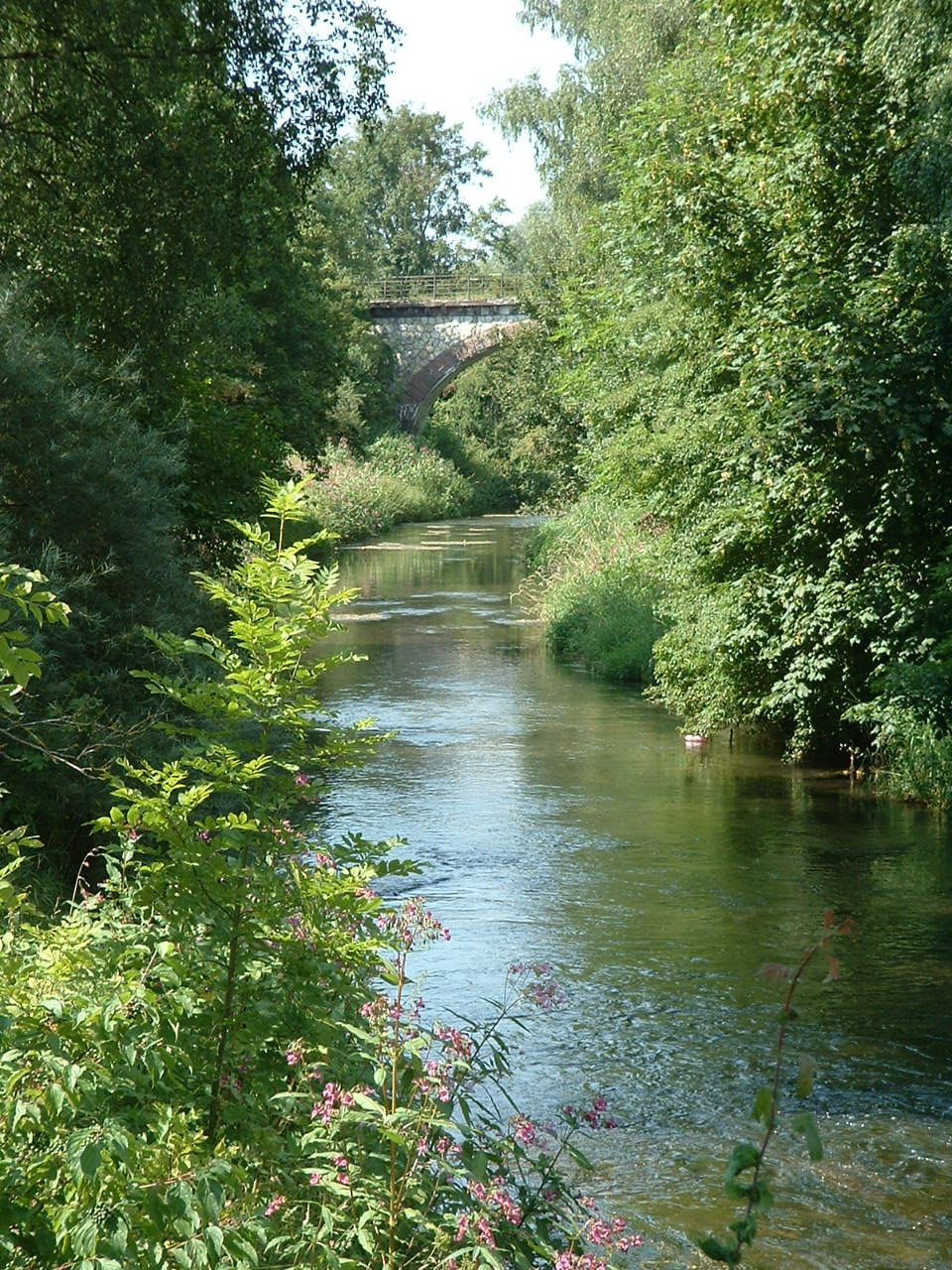
River Rottum in Laupheim with railway bridge in the background

Laupheim is situated in the region of Upper Swabia approximately 20 km north of Biberach and 20 km south of Ulm on the Bundesstraße 30. Laupheim is the second largest city in the district of Biberach. The original settlement of Laupheim was located close to the Rottum which still runs through the city but since 1950 the city has expanded and sprawls onto the surrounding slopes.

With effect of 1 Januar 2016 Laupheim has been awarded the status of major district town.

The elevation within the city confines ranges from 509 m (1670 ft) above sea level at the bottom of the valley to 539 m (1768 ft) in the outlying suburban areas.

Apart from the city of Laupheim itself, the following once autonomous villages nowadays belong administratively to Laupheim: Baustetten (population 2121), Obersulmetingen (population 1389), Untersulmetingen (population 2082) and Bihlafingen (population 853), which, with an elevation of 580 m (1903 ft), has the highest elevation of the administrative area.

== History ==
The area in and around Laupheim has been settled from very early times onwards. Archaeological evidence shows that 15000 years ago nomadic tribes roamed the countryside. From ca. 2000 BCE onwards, Celts inhabited this area. From the first century CE until around the year 260 CE, it was part of the Roman province of Raetia, after which the Alamanni invaded the Agri Decumates, eventually also settling in the area that was to become Laupheim. During archaeological excavations in 1840-1842 graves dating from the Merovingian period were discovered in the northern part of the town.

Laupheim was first mentioned as Louphaim in a charter dated 778. The charter is still kept in the archives of the monastery of St Gallen, Switzerland. This reference is the earliest of any city in Upper Swabia and any parish in the district of Biberach.

Situated in the vicinity of two major trade routes between the Lake of Constance and Ulm and the Swabian Alb and the valley of the river Iller respectively, Laupheim developed into a major settlement. In 853, it was elevated to the status of town when a court responsible for the Rammachgau (also spelled Rammagau) was set up there.

During the 9th century, parts of Laupheim came into the possession of the monastery of Weißenburg which was afterwards passed on to successive minor Swabian aristocratic houses.

As early as the 10th century, Laupheim possessed a parish church with subsidiaries. In 926, Laupheim and its surroundings were destroyed by the Hungarians. A castle is mentioned around the year 1100.

Laupheim appears to have been home of an indigenous noble family, whose members used the suffix von Laupheim. They were attested for the first time in 1110 with Landoldus de Lobhein and seemed to have been in service of the counts of Kirchberg. The last known member of this family was Berchtolt von Laupheim who was a citizen of Ulm 1372, long after his family has lost possession of any rights in Laupheim around 1310.

After the collapse of the Empire of the Staufers during the 13th century, the castle and parish of Laupheim came into the possession of the Truchsessen von Waldburg who, in 1331, sold Laupheim together with their other possessions in Upper Swabia to the Austrian House of Habsburg.

The Habsburgs mortgaged Laupheim in 1334 to the barons von Ellerbach and enfeoffed this baronial family in 1407 with castle, town and patronage of the church.

The village was badly affected by the crisis of the mid 14th century, caused by the Black Death and other factors. The population shrunk and as a consequence the hamlet of Ringelhausen, situated between Laupheim and Bronnen, was abandoned and eventually lost in the 15th century. Only the name of a street and a development area in the city of Laupheim nowadays hints at the existence of this hamlet.

The Herren von Ellerbach had St Leonhard's Chapel built in 1448, which soon became a place of pilgrimage.

In 1430, Emperor Sigismund bestowed upon Burkhard von Ellerbach the right to hold regular markets, Laupheim thereby becoming a market town, and also the privilege of inflicting high justice, which gave him the right to hold a criminal court inflicting bodily punishment, including the death penalty. The local ruler was now master of life and death. Due to the weekly market and the annual Gallus-market, Laupheim quickly developed into a commercial centre.

During the course of the German Peasants' War 1525, Laupheim Castle was destroyed by the Baltringer Haufen, an army of peasants named after the nearby village of Baltringen, where approximately 12.000 farmers gathered to form an army. After the suppression of the revolt, the peasants were forced to rebuild the castle.

After the agnatic line of the Ellerbach dynasty became extinct in 1570, Laupheim passed through Hans Pankraz von Freyberg to the Herren von Welden in 1582. They turned Laupheim into their permanent residence and established the first school in 1584. From 1582 until 1806, Laupheim was a Lordship (Reichsritterschaft) ruled by the heir of the Welden family, whose title was "Imperial Knight" (Reichsritter).

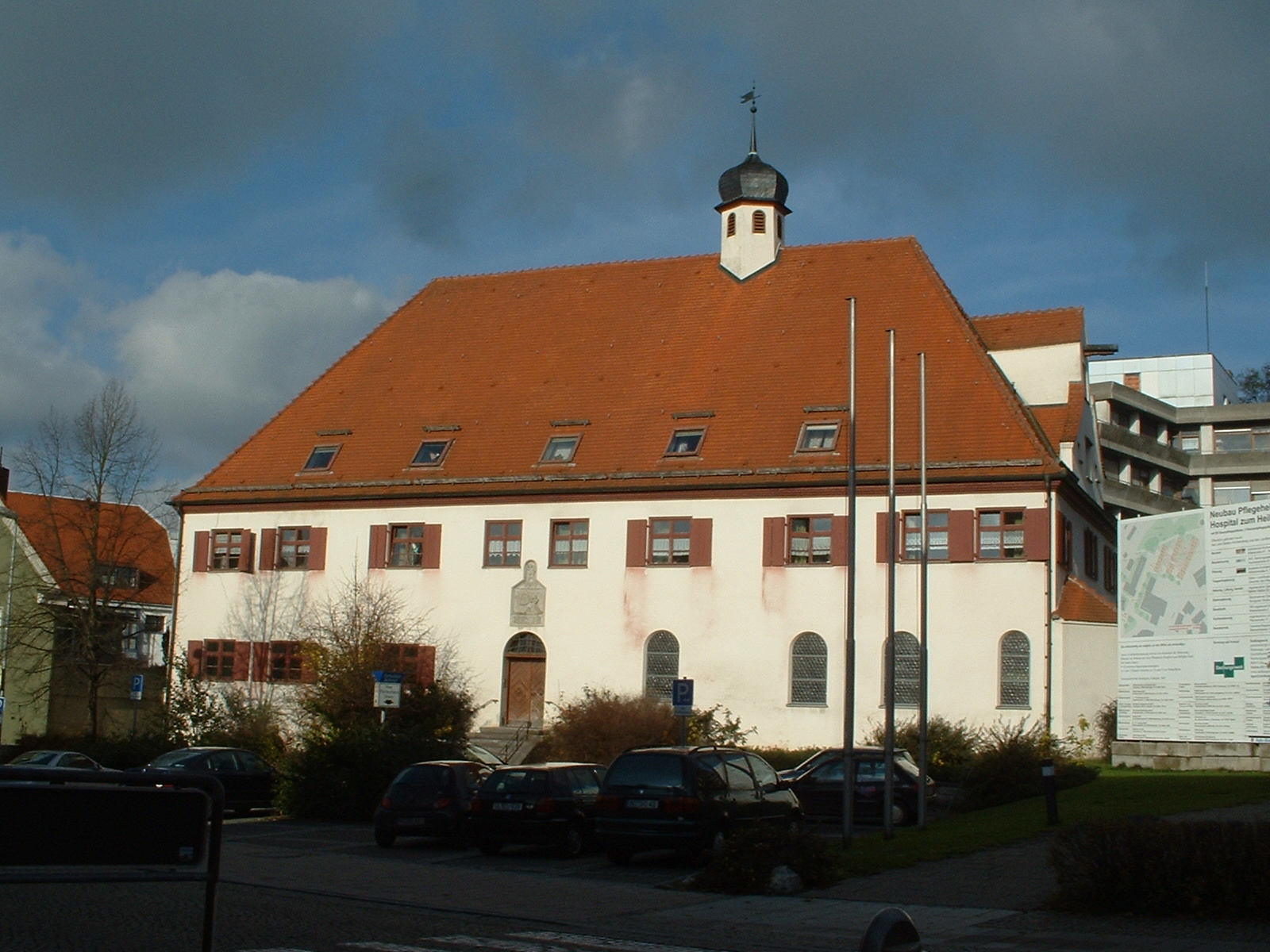
Former Hospital of the Holy Spirit

In 1596, the right to bear a coat of arms was given to Laupheim, showing the colours of green, white and red together with three leaves on a three hills, thereby incorporating the coat-of-arms of the family of Welden with the three leaves, referring to the name of the town on the hills of the valley of the river Rottum.

The last member of the House of Ellerbach, Anna von Freyberg, founded the Hospital of the Holy Spirit in 1601, the building of which still exists and now functions as a retirement home.

Between 1623 and 1661, the church St. Peter and Paul was built in the vicinity of the castle.

Due to the inheritance laws of the house of Welden, the market town was divided into two different territories, Großlaupheim and Kleinlaupheim (Great Laupheim and Little Laupheim), in 1621, at the beginning of the Thirty Years' War (1618–1648), each territory being ruled by its own dynasty. As a consequence economic growth slowed down.

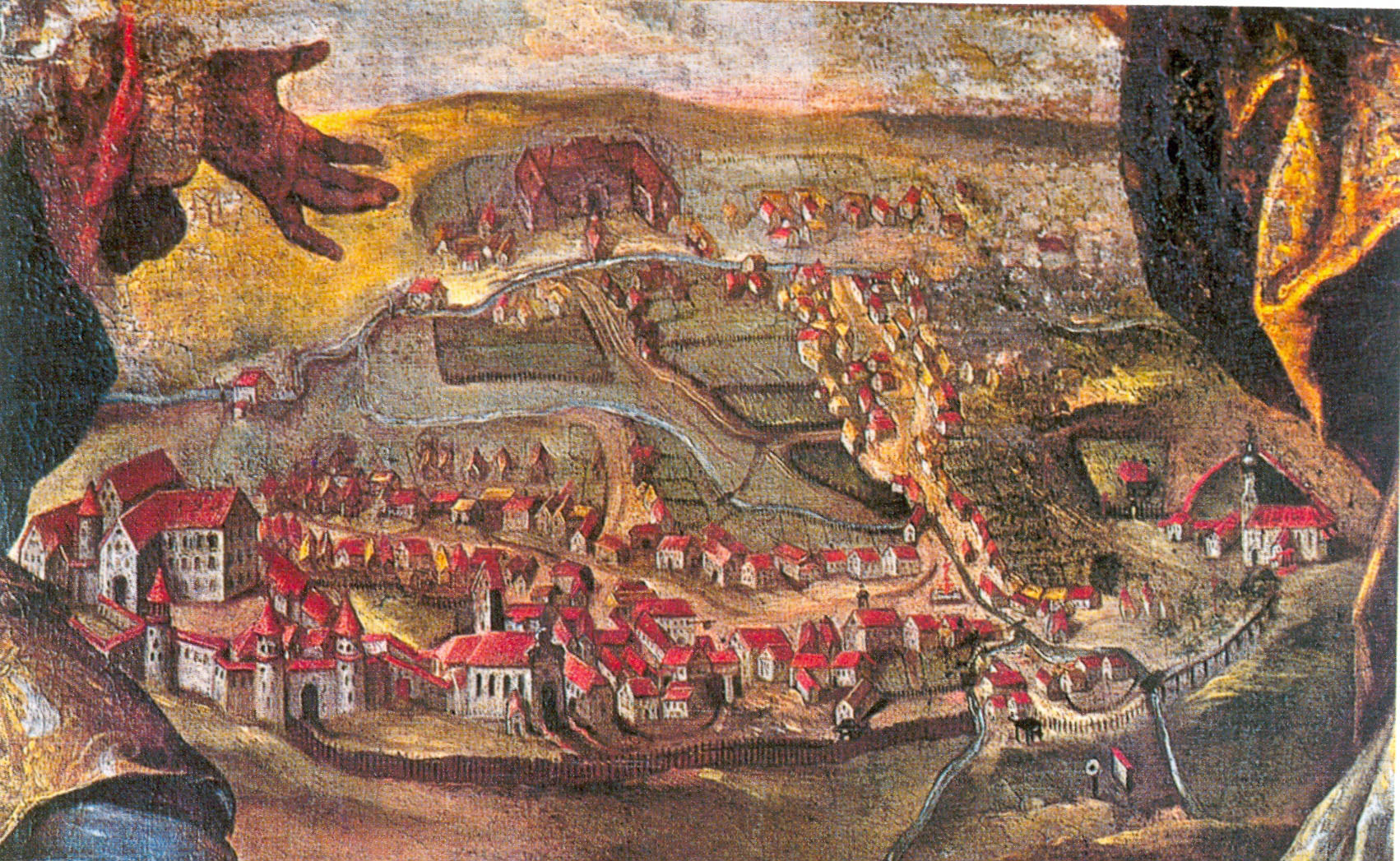
Laupheim 1726 with Großlaupheim Castle on the left and Kleinlaupheim Castle at the top

During the Thirty Years' War, Laupheim repeatedly fell victim to the ravages of war, mainly due to marauding troops, both imperial, that is Catholic, and Swedish, their Protestant opponents. A massive outbreak of the bubonic plague in 1635 further diminished the population. At the close of the Thirty Years' War, Laupheim had lost two-thirds of its pre-war population, so that ultimately towards the end of the 17th century, Laupheim had sunk to the status of an unimportant, impoverished village. As a consequence of the Thirty Years' War, the feudal lords attempted to increase taxation and extend the amount of socage the peasants had to do for them. This led to legal conflicts between the two parties, which lasted for decades.

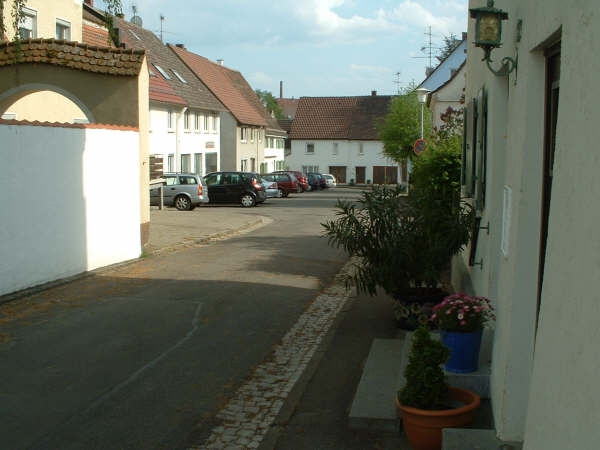
Judenberg in Laupheim

In order to stimulate the local economy and income generated by taxation, Carl Damian von Welden allowed the first Jewish families to settle in Großlaupheim in the 1720s. This which was made possible by a contract, protecting the Jews. The Jews were made to settle in an area of the town soon to be called Judenberg (literally Jews' mountain or Jews' hill). Subsequently, a Jewish quarter evolved, with a cemetery, synagogue, school and a Rabbi's office.

During the 18th century, the Welden dynasty had the old castle, Großlaupheim Castle, restored, and subsequently renewed in Baroque-style in 1752. Between 1766 and 1769, the branch of the Welden dynasty that ruled Kleinlaupheim had their residence renewed in Baroque-style by architect Johann Georg Specht. This castle is now called Schloss Kleinlaupheim (Kleinlaupheim Castle). This makes Laupheim unique in that it has two castles within its city boundaries, as a result of once having been two independent states.

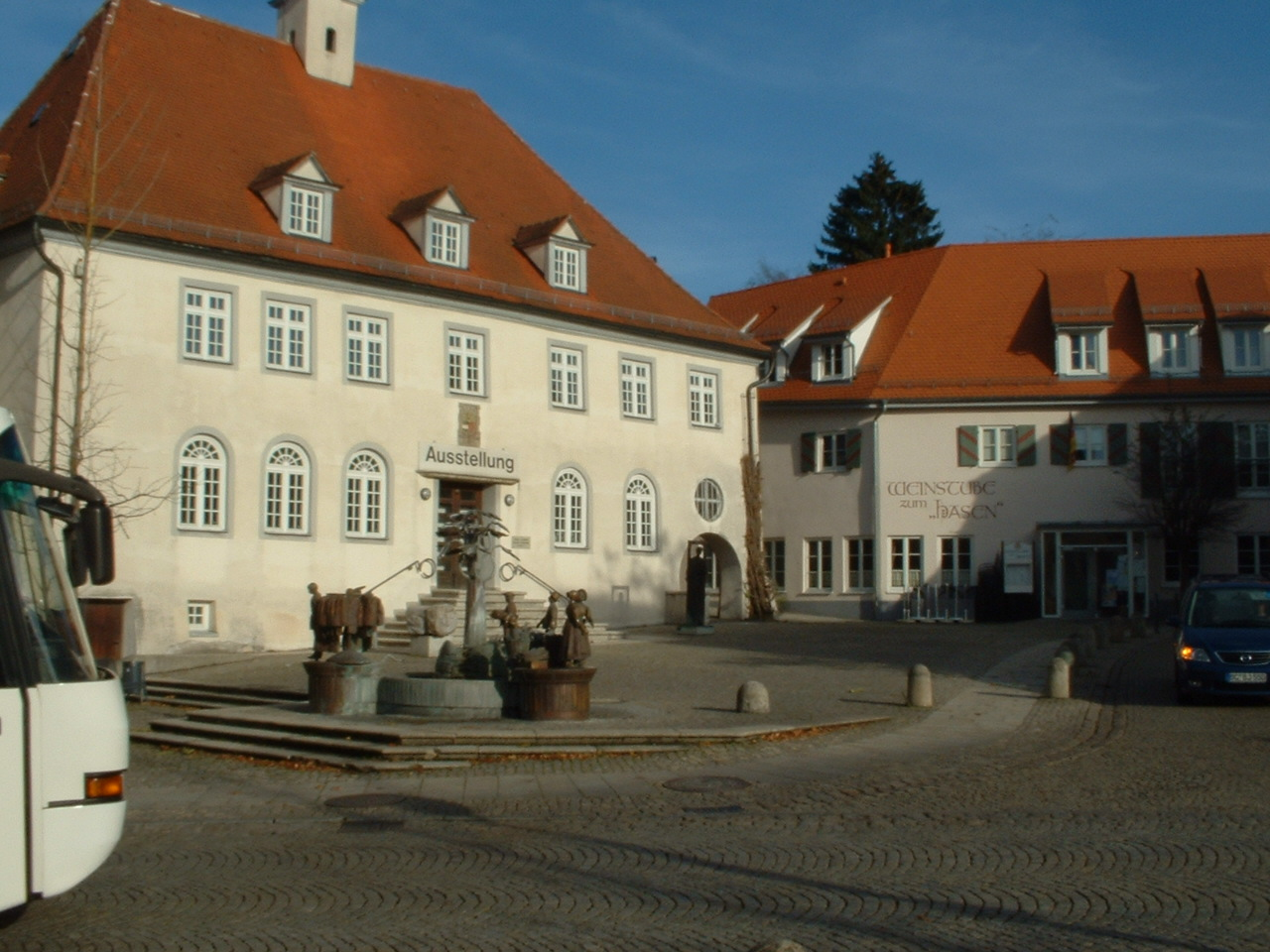
Schranne (granary)

In 1778, a town hall and the granary were built in the Upper Market Square.

Following the Reichsdeputationshauptschluss, the mediatisation and secularisation of numerous secular and ecclesiastical principalities within the former Holy Roman Empire, both parts of Laupheim were annexed by the newly formed Kingdom of Württemberg in 1806. The last ruler of Laupheim was Constantin von Welden. Laupheim first became administratively part of the district of Wiblingen, but in 1845 the district administration was moved to Laupheim, creating the district of Laupheim. The district as abolished in 1938 when Laupheim became part of the district of Biberach.

Due to laws based on the ideas of the enlightenment, servitude in the Kingdom of Württemberg was abolished in 1836. During the same period, laws forcing Jews to live in separate quarters and excluding them from most business activities were revoked. This enabled them to contribute enormously to the economic upturn Laupheim was experiencing, even though complete civil rights were not granted until 1864.

In 1848, with the arrival of civil servants from the original Duchy of Württemberg (Altwürttemberg), a Protestant parish was founded.

In 1850, a train station opened two kilometers west of Laupheim, on the railway line Ulm-Friedrichshafen from Ulm to Friedrichshafen, this station therefore being named as Laupheim-West.

In 1869, Laupheim was granted a city charter by King Karl I. of Württemberg. In the same year, the first institute of further education, a Lateinschule, was established in Laupheim. In 1871, Laupheim, being part of the Kingdom of Württemberg, was incorporated into the German Empire.

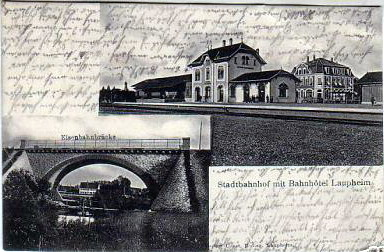
Laupheim, main train station ca. 1904

During the steep economic growth of the Gründerzeit, the period between 1871 and 1914, Laupheim had the highest density of public houses in the whole Kingdom of Württemberg.

In 1904, the city was connected to the railway line Ulm-Friedrichshafen by a branch line, linking the railway artery with the city itself. At the same time a train station was built in the city. This extension of the railway line went on for a further 16 km, terminating at the village of Schwendi.

Before World War I, Laupheim had one of the largest Jewish communities in Württemberg. However, the appointment of Adolf Hitler as Chancellor of Germany in 1933 and the systematic deprivation and subsequent suppression of Jews in Germany, also had their effects on Laupheim, culminating in the destruction by fire of the synagogue during Kristallnacht 1938.

Due to the programme of aryanization, many businesses in Laupheim originally owned by Jews, were expropriated and transferred into German ownership. 126 of 312 Jewish inhabitants of Laupheim managed to flee abroad, most of them after the so-called Kristallnacht. In 1939, the remaining Jews in Laupheim were resettled within the city, only to be deported to concentration and extermination camps in 1941 and 1942. After the last of four transports, the Jewish community in Laupheim ceased to exist on 19 August 1942.

Sixty-two Jewish citizens of Laupheim were murdered in the Shoah, only two survived.

After World War II, in the 1960s, Laupheim began to renew and modernize its appearance. New schools were built: a grammar school, a realschule and a new town hall. From the 1980s onwards, these projects were followed by a new district hospital, a public in-doors swimming pool, a renovated stadium, named after Gretel Bergmann who was born in Laupheim, and an omnibus interchange.

Additionally, several industrial estates on the outskirts of the city were established in order to attract trade and industry. As a consequence, companies from outside Laupheim established offices and production facilities there, as well as companies that formerly had been operating from the city centre.

== Population ==
Year	Population
1500	950
1600	1,240
1700	1,660
1806	2,369
1820	2,687
1832	2,934
1840	3,251
1844	3,457
1854	3,712
1871	6,302
1900	7,319
1925	8,467
1933	8,572
1939	8,402
1950	10,337
1961	11,997
1971	14,582
1981	15,095
1991	16,831
2001	18,626
2008	19,576
2009	19,668
2010	19,796
2011	19,700
2012	19,951
2013	20,213
2014	20,655
2015	21,153
2016	21,742
2017	22,136
2018	22,387
2019	22,429
2020	22,579
2021	22,595
2022	22,758
2023	22,946

Having developed from a rural market town into a city, predominated by industry, trade and the service industries, the demographics of Laupheim have changed as well.

After growing continuously from 1871 until 1933, from the Gründerzeit until the Nazis came to power, this development came to a halt. The stagnation and eventual decrease in population was due to increasing persecution of the Jews, as a result of which many Jewish inhabitants left Laupheim or, after 1940, were deported and subsequently murdered.

Since 1945, the population of Laupheim has almost doubled. This is due to the fact that a great number of refugees from formerly German territories east of the Oder-Neisse line were settled in Laupheim.

The establishment of a German Army Aviation Corps airbase in 1964 further contributed to the growth in population.

After the collapse of the Soviet Union in 1991, an influx of ethnic Germans from the Commonwealth of Independent States added to the population growth.

As of 31 December 2019, the number of non-German inhabitants of Laupheim totals 3,269 (14.58% of the total population).

== Government and politics ==
=== Mayors since 1825 ===
Years	Name
1825-1838	Christian Paul Koch
1838–1850	Johann Gottfried Brigel
1850–1872	Franz Seraph Müller
1872–1880	Konrad Hepperle
1880–1882	Heinrich Hepperle
1883–1924	Johannes Schick
1924–1934	Franz Konrad
1934–1945	Ludwig Marxer
1945–1946	Adolf Sheffold
1946	Josef Hyneck
1946–1949	Karl Wiest
1949–1963	Alfons Hagel
1963–1966	vacant
1966–2002	Otmar Schick
2002–2010	Monika Sitter
2010–2017	Rainer Kapellen
2017–2021	Gerold Rechle
2022–present	Ingo Bergmann

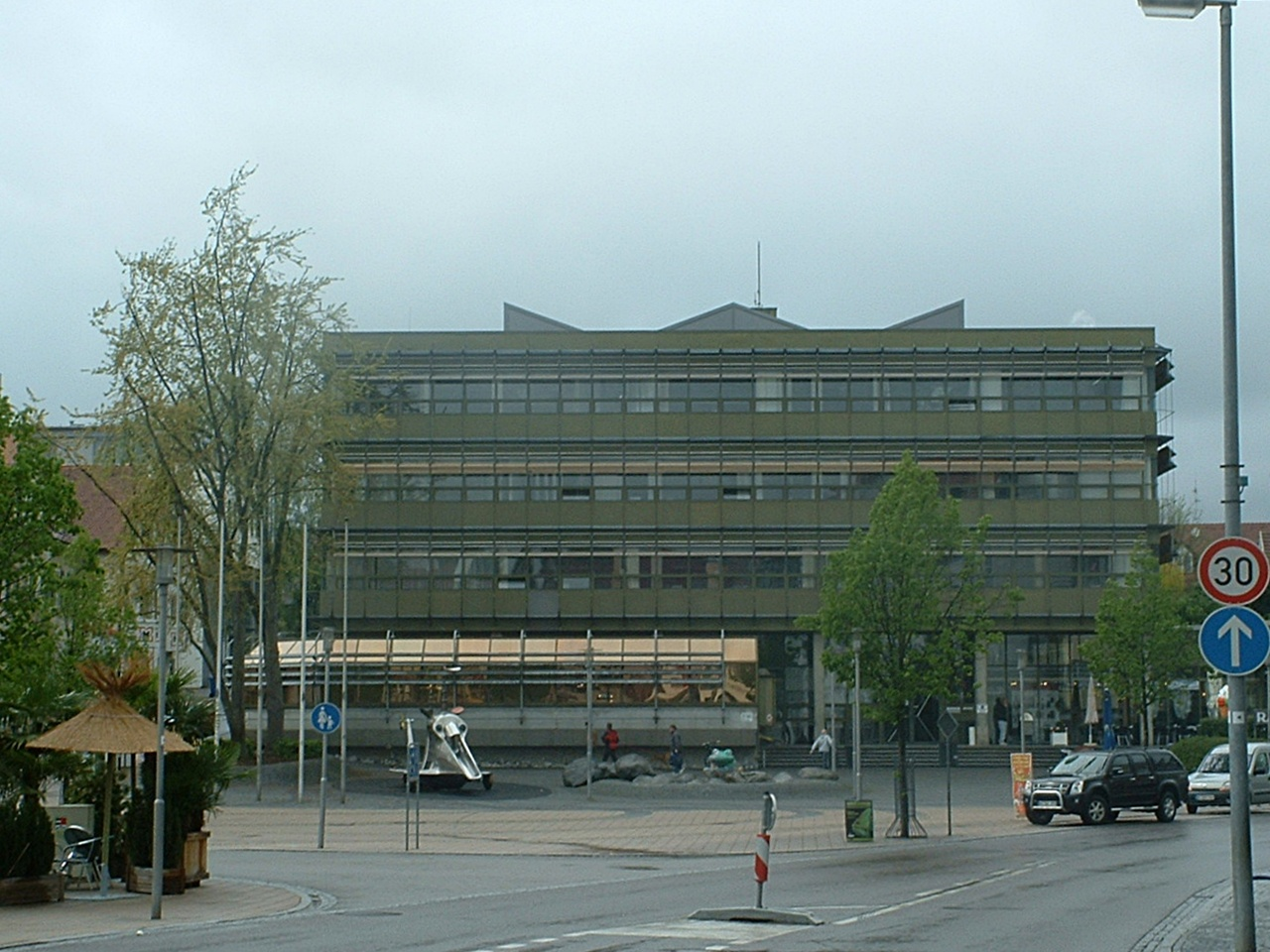
Laupheim town hall

=== City council ===
The city council consists of 33 members.

During the local elections on 9 June 2024, all seats on the city council were contested. The elections gave the following result:

Party	Percentage	Gains/Losses	Seats	Gains/Losses
FW	30.4	▼7.0	10	Steady
CDU	24.5	▼3.4	8	Steady
Open List	18.4	▼8.4	6	▼1
Free List	11.5	▲11.5	4	▲4
SPD	10.4	▲2.5	3	▲1
AfD	4.8	▲4.8	2	▲2

The next local elections are due to be held in 2029.

=== Members of state and federal parliaments ===
Laupheim is part of the constituency of Biberach for elections to the Landtag of Baden-Württemberg as well as the Bundestag.

The following politicians were or are from Laupheim:

- Franz Pfender, (5 August 1899 – 9 July 1972), CDU, member of the Bundestag 1949–1953.
- Franz Baum, (born 6 May 1927), CDU, member of the Landtag 1972–1988.
- Franz Romer, (born 2 February 1942), CDU, member of the Bundestag 1990–1994, 1996–2009.
- Gerd Scheffold, (born 27 January 1954), CDU, member of the Landtag 1992–2001.
- Thomas Dörflinger, (born 12 September 1969), CDU, member of the Landtag since 2016.

=== International links ===
Laupheim is formally twinned with:

- Feyzin, France
- (Germany) Neustadt an der Orla, Thuringia (former GDR)

== Economy, industry and infrastructure ==
=== Traffic ===
- Road: the western borders of the city itself are marked by the Bundesstraße 30. Laupheim is connected by three junctions to this federal road. It was planned to upgrade this federal road to autobahn status, turning it into the A89. These plans were dropped in the early 1980s.
- Railway: the Württemberg Southern Railway (Ulm-Friedrichshafen) passes Laupheim about 2 km from the built-up area. Laupheim-West railway station serves passengers from the surrounding area. From this railway station another line branches off into Laupheim, terminating at the city railway station. It was part of a longer railway line, originally leading to Schwendi. However, during the 1970s and 1980s, the whole extension was gradually closed down, dismantled, and the service replaced by buses. Only the section leading from the city railway station to Laupheim-West remained and was later renovated and re-opened in 1999 with a direct connection to Langenau via Ulm Central Station. Passengers travelling south to Biberach an der Riß still had to change trains at Laupheim-West station. Plans existed, however, to establish direct trains from Laupheim to Biberach an der Riß. In June 2011, after construction works lasting two years a new southern route towards Biberach was opened. In order to facilitate railway traffic a second railway platform was built at Laupheim city station. The Regional-Express line RE 5 calls hourly at Laupheim West. Since December 2020, the Laupheim West (lines RS 2 and RS 21) and Laupheim city (line RS 21) stations are connected to the new Danube-Iller Regional S-Bahn, replacing former Regionalbahn lines.
- Bus: Laupheim, being part of the regional Danube-Iller Traffic Network, is at the centre of a network of local and regional buslines leading into all directions, serving the surrounding villages.

=== Industry ===
The following companies, some of them operating internationally, are based in Laupheim:

- Uhlmann Pac-Systeme GmbH & Co. KG: manufacturer of machines for packaging of pharmaceutical products.
- Rentschler Biopharma SE: pharmaceutical products.
- Kässbohrer Geländefahrzeug: snow grooming vehicles.
- Diehl Aerospace: manufacturer of interior aircraft components.
- Kronenbrauerei Laupheim: brewery (since 1753)
- Hamann Motorsport GmbH: car tuning and aerodynamic body kits.
- JERMI Käsewerk GmbH & Co. KG.: cheese products.
- Licon mt GmbH & Co. KG: machine tools.
- Colep Laupheim GmbH & Co.KG: manufacturer of aerosol sprays.
- Bergmann GmbH & Co. KG: wigs and other hair products.

=== Education ===
The following educational establishments exist in Laupheim and its subordinate villages:

- Primary schools
  - Anna-von-Freyberg-Grundschule (Grundschule: primary school)
  - Grundschule Bronner Berg (Grundschule: primary school)
  - Grundschule in Bihlafingen (Grundschule: primary school)
  - Lehrer-Beth-Grundschule in Untersulmetingen (Grundschule: primary school)
  - Bischof-Ulrich-Schule, Grundschule Obersulmetingen (Grundschule: primary school, formerly including Hauptschule: secondary school for general studies)
  - Ivo-Schaible-Grund- und Hauptschule in Baustetten (Grundschule: primary school, formerly including Hauptschule)
- Secondary schools
  - Friedrich-Uhlmann-Schule (Hauptschule and Werkrealschule: secondary school for general studies)
  - Friedrich-Adler-Realschule (Realschule: secondary school leading up to Mittlere Reife)
  - Carl-Laemmle-Gymnasium (Gymnasium: secondary school leading up to Abitur)t
- Vocational training school
  - Kilian-von-Steiner-Schule (Berufsschule: vocational training school)
- Other
  - Wieland-Förderschule (Förderschule: school for children with special needs)
  - Staatliches Seminar für Didaktik und Lehrerbildung Laupheim (teacher-training college)

=== Legal ===
Laupheim had a magistrates' court which was a branch of the district court of Biberach. The Laupheim branch was closed on 1 April 2004. The town hall houses the offices of the district notary.

=== Media ===
- Schwäbische Zeitung (Swabian Newspaper) contains a local supplement for Laupheim and its surroundings.
- Wochenblatt (Weekly Paper), free weekly newspaper.

=== Military ===
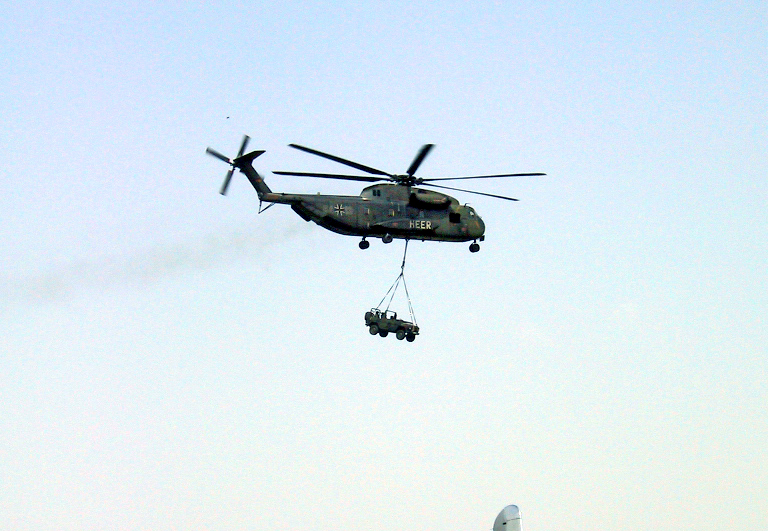
CH-53D at ILA 2002

Laupheim was home to Medium Transport Helicopter Regiment 25 "Oberschwaben" (Upper Swabia) and Support Squadron 10 of the German Army Aviation Corps (Heeresflieger). The German Army Aviation Corps base was established in 1964 utilizing already existing facilities. Medium Transport Regiment 25 was disbanded on 31 December 2012 when personnel and material were transferred to the German Air Force and re-established as Helicopter Wing 64 on 1 January 2013. Helicopter Wing 64 is equipped with transport helicopter CH-53 and light utility helicopter H145M LUH SOF. German Army Aviation Corps Support Squadron 10 was equipped with helicopters of the type Bo-105. The unit disbanded in 2007.

Until the beginning of the 1990s the regiment had only seen service in other NATO countries, mainly while on manoeuvre or on aid-missions after natural disasters. Since then, however, it has been deployed abroad on various aid-missions and so far has seen service on NATO and United Nations peacekeeping missions, first in Iraq after the 1st Gulf War, then on the Balkans with IFOR, KFOR, SFOR and EUFOR, in Afghanistan as part of ISAF, which is ongoing, and most recently in the Democratic Republic of the Congo as part of EUFOR RD Congo to support the UN mission MONUC to monitor the general elections in 2006. This mission began in June 2006 and ended with the last soldiers returning in December of the same year.

With a workforce of about 1,350, both military and civilian, the base is the largest, single employer in Laupheim.

== Attractions ==
=== Großlaupheim Castle ===
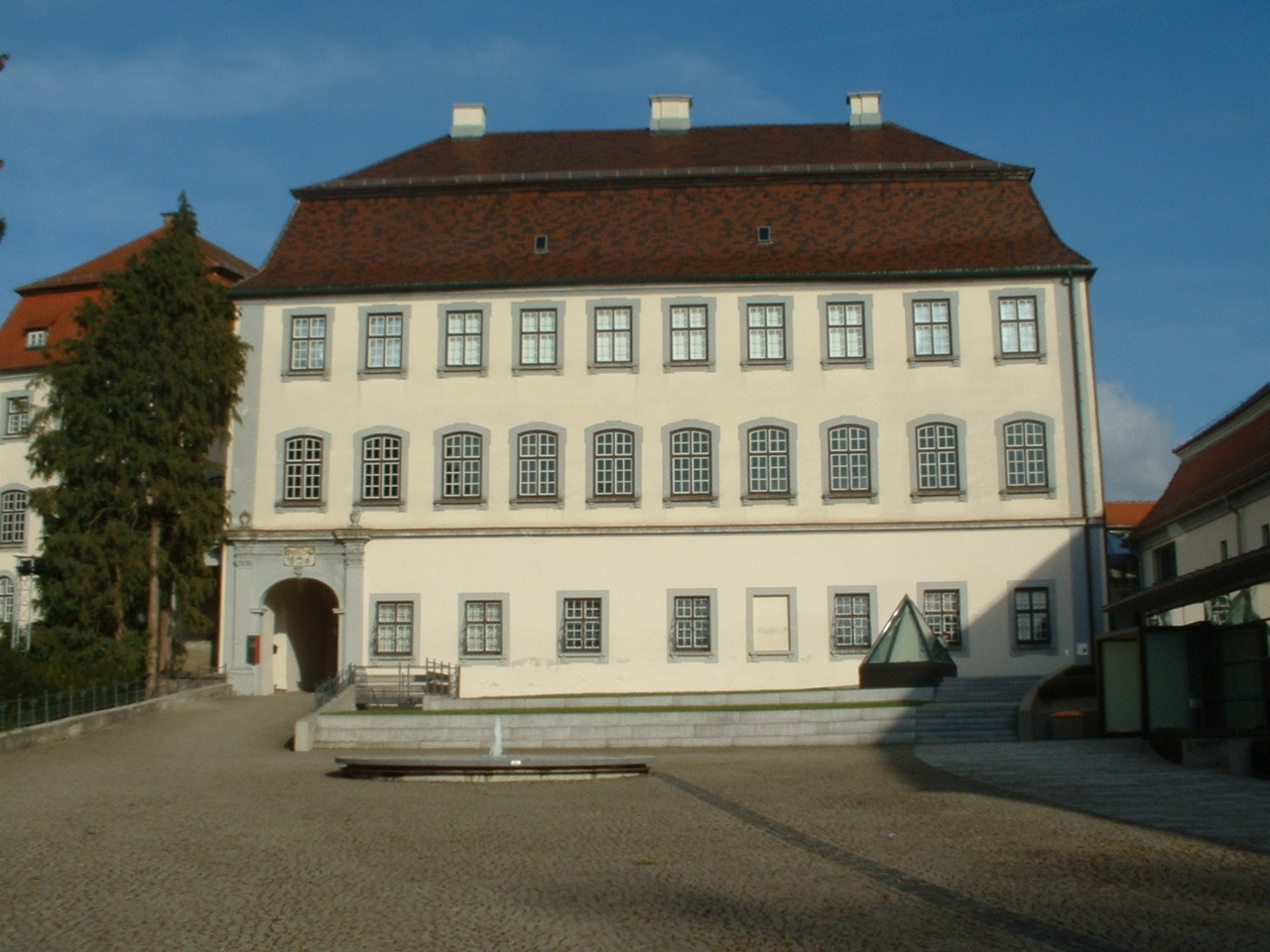
Großlaupheim Castle

Großlaupheim Castle is situated on a hill on the verge of the city close to the local parish church. The existence of a castle in Laupheim was documented for the first time around the year 1100. There is no evidence that the castle originally consisted of more than a wooden structure. This castle existed until the Peasants' War in 1525, when it was destroyed by rebellious peasants. After the end of hostilities, the peasants were forced to rebuild the castle in stone. The structure as it stands today was erected in three different phases:

- The so-called Feudal Castle (Lehenschloss), the oldest part, dates from the middle of the 16th century. It consists of a three-storey, square edifice with two flanking round towers.
- Adjoining it, the so-called New Castle (Neues Schloss) (built between 1660 and 1680) with an early Baroque square flanked by arcades and a gateway.

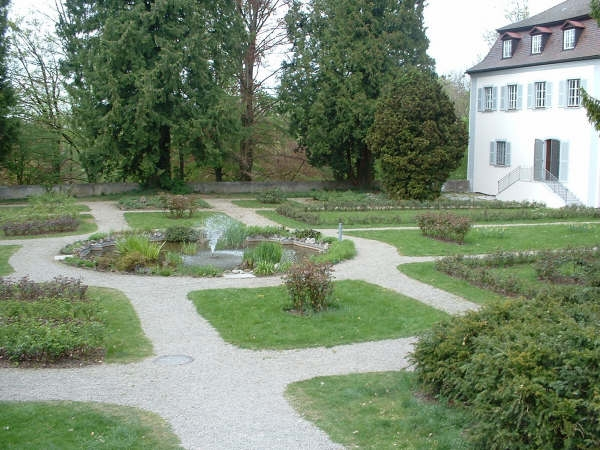
Baroque rose garden with Kleines Schlössle

- Somewhat removed but still part of the complex, the so-called Little Castle (Kleines Schlössle) was built in the middle of the 17th century. It was used by the Freiherren von Welden as dwelling place for the widows of former rulers of Laupheim. On a terrace below the castle buildings, a small rose garden was designed in Baroque-style.

=== Museum of the History of Christians and Jews ===
The Museum of the History of Christians and Jews is situated in Großlaupheim Castle. It is unique in Germany in that its collection concentrates on the documentation of the relationship between Christians and Jews on a local level, using Laupheim, which once had the largest Jewish community in the Kingdom of Württemberg, as an example. The exhibition documents in chronological order all aspects of more than 200 years of Jewish life in Laupheim.

=== Castle Park ===
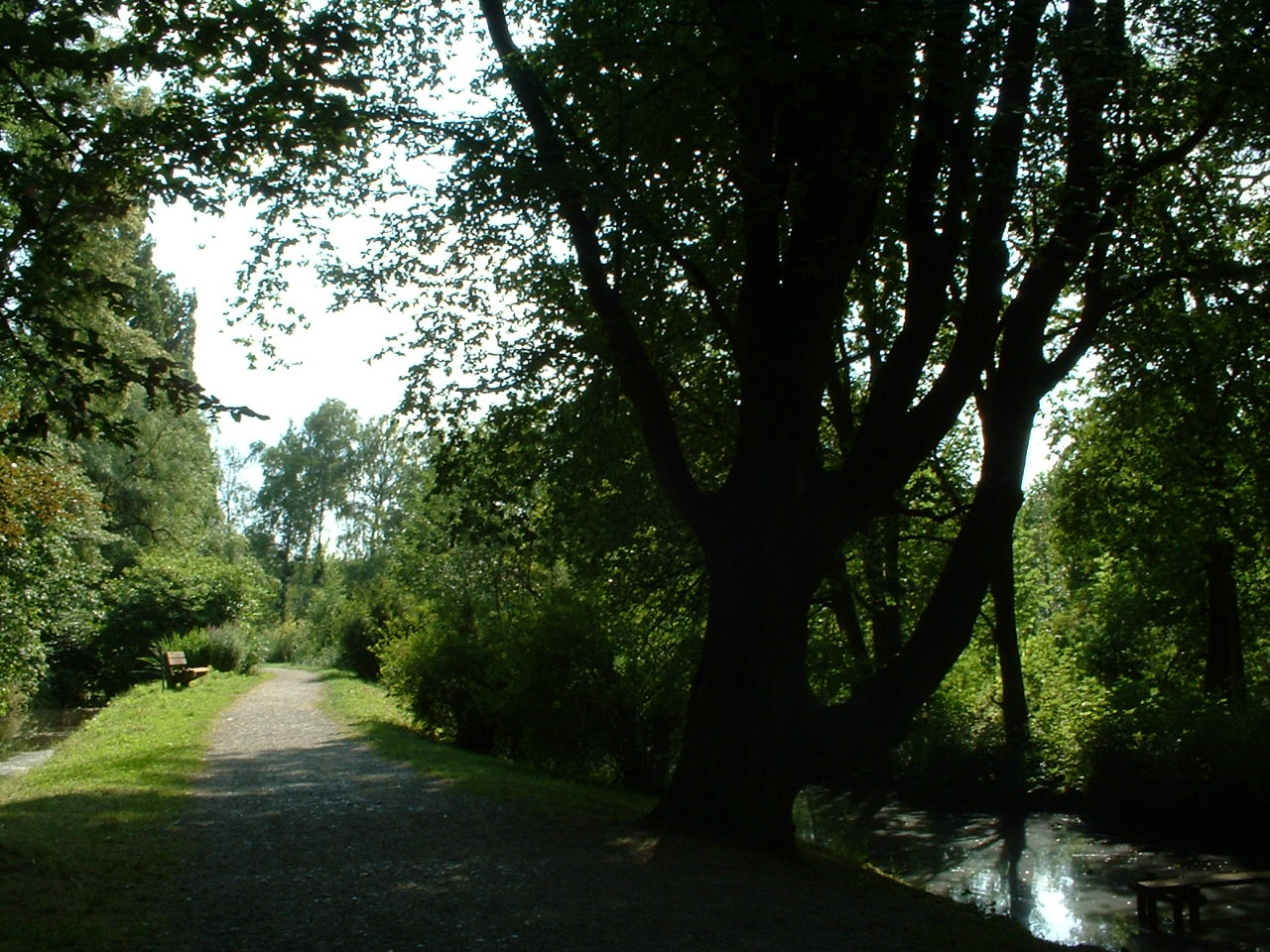
Castle Park

The park is situated at the bottom of the hill on top of which Schloss Großlaupheim lies. The castle park was designed in the English Style by Kilian von Steiner. A huge number of trees, meadows and lakes created an impressive appearance. Originally, it was well known for its exotic trees and plants. Formerly, there were five lakes, which, during winter, provided a brewery with ice. During summer, the lakes were used for raising trout. However, in recent times the maintenance of the ground and the lakes was neglected due to a lack of council funding. In recent years efforts have been made to restore the park, at least in parts, to its former glory. In 2011, the park was declared a "Garden Monument' by the state of Baden-Württemberg's National Trust.

=== Kleinlaupheim Castle ===
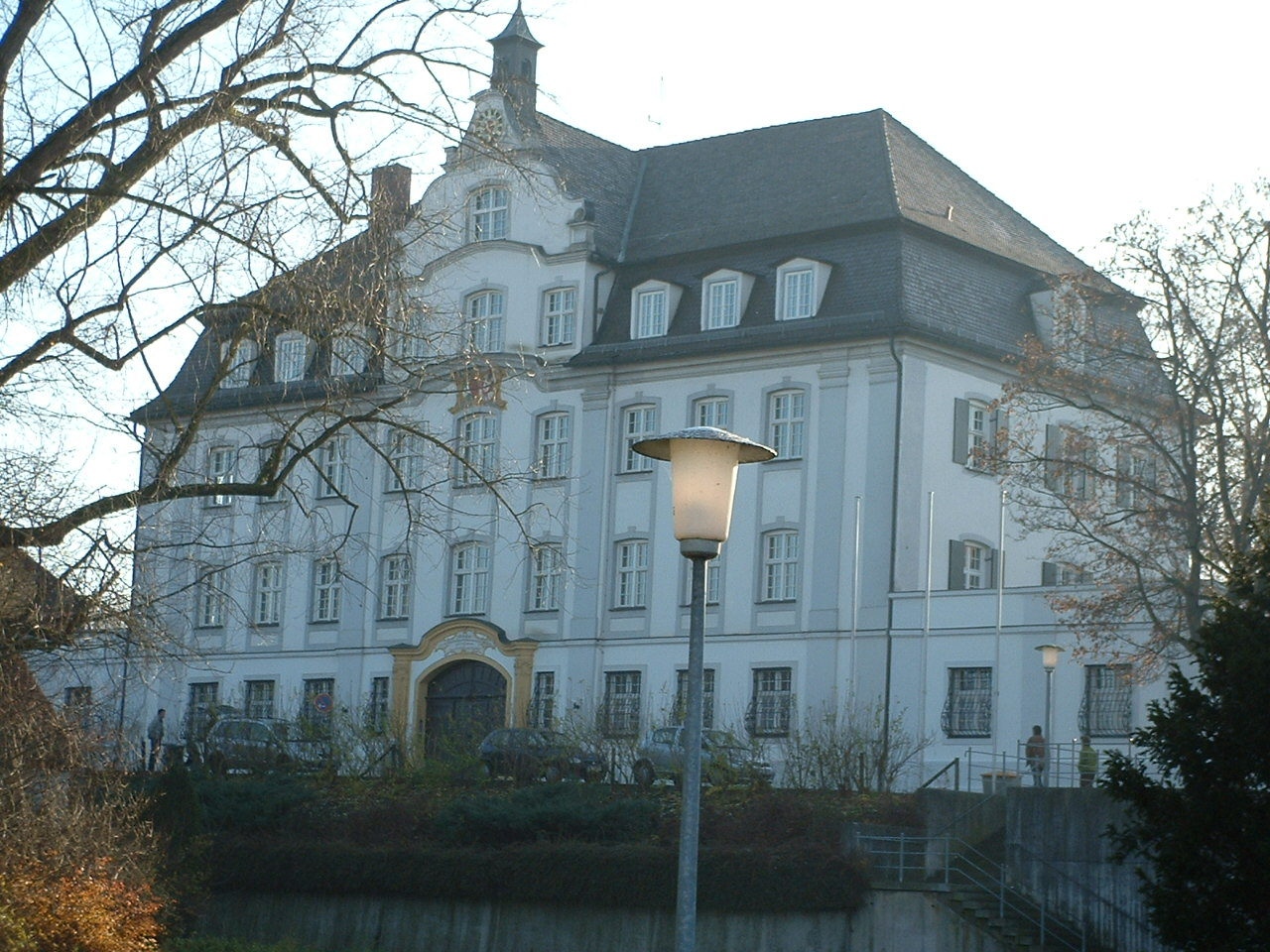
Kleinlaupheim Castle

Kleinlaupheim Castle is situated on a hill south-west of the river Rottum within the city limits of Laupheim. In its present state it was built between 1766 and 1769 as a place of residence for the ruler of Kleinlaupheim at the time, the Freiherr Joseph Ignaz von Welden-Kleinlaupheim (1721–1802). It was designed by Johann Georg Specht of Lindenberg in Baroque-style. It consists of a three-storey building with a curved mansard roof. Pilasters, cornices and gables enliven the facade of the building. Inside there is a remarkable grand staircase in the vestibule.

It now houses the local police station and an art gallery, Die Wache Galerie, a pun on words in that Wache can mean police station as well as alert or awake.

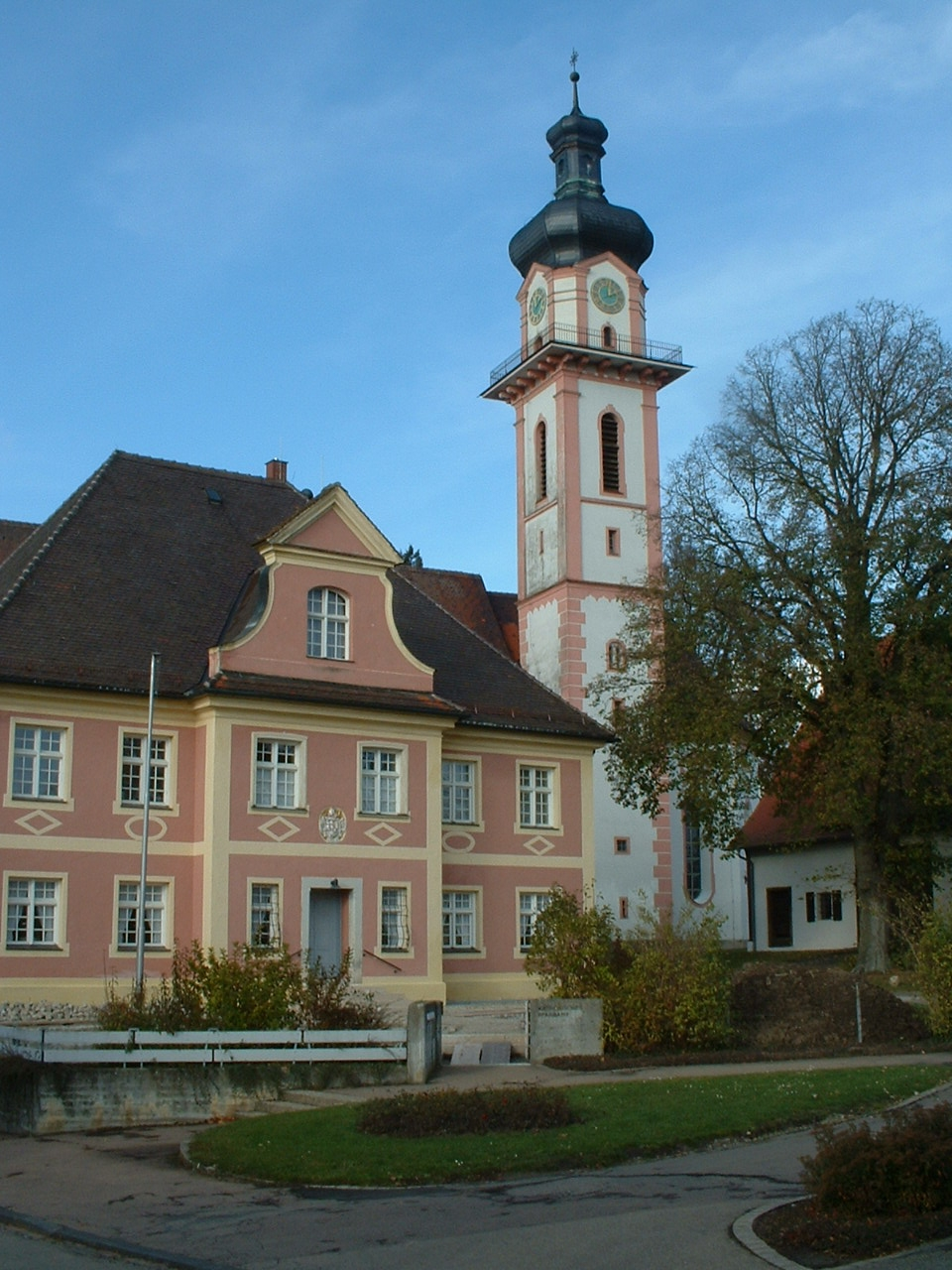
Parish Church St Peter and Paul with rectory

=== Parish Church St Peter and Paul ===
The Parish Church St Peter and Paul, built between 1623 and 1661, lies in close proximity to Großlaupheim Castle. It was designed by Martino I. Barbieri from Roveredo in Baroque-style, showing influences of manierism. The interior of the church is decorated with sculptures by Dominikus Hermenegild Herberger and paintings by Johann Georg Bergmüller.

=== Planetarium and Public Observatory ===
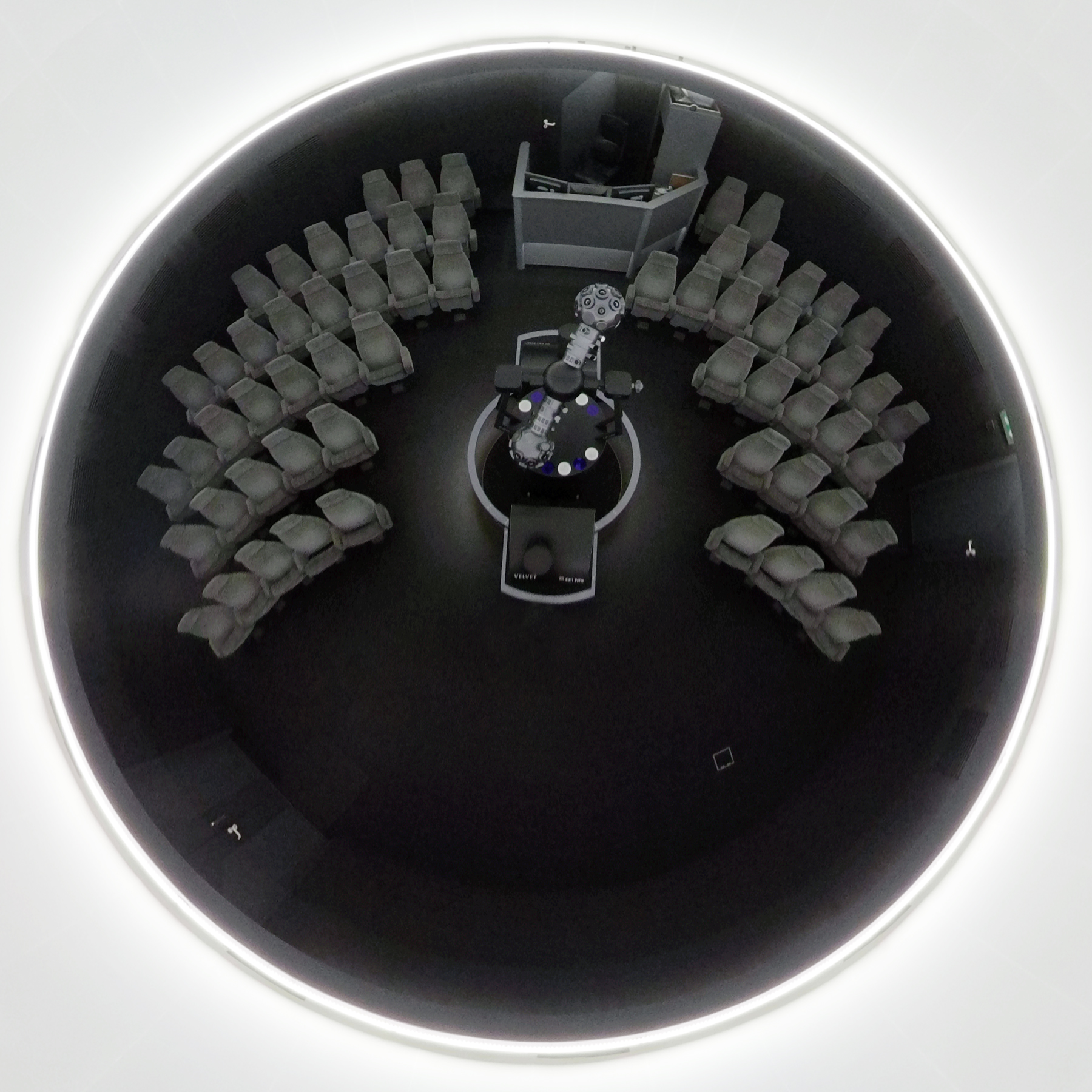
Laupheim planetarium, view from top of the dome

The planetarium and public astronomical observatory of Laupheim (German: Volkssternwarte Laupheim) counts about 40000 visitors each year. It is run on a mostly voluntary basis by the club Volkssternwarte Laupheim e.V. (founded 1975), providing high quality astronomical education. The work of the club has been recognized by astronomer Carolyn Shoemaker, who named the asteroid 7167 Laupheim in honour of the institution.

=== The Laupheimer Kinder- und Heimatfest ===
The annual historical festival, the Kinder- und Heimatfest, takes place during the last weekend of June. It consists of processions and parades, performed by various groups, incorporating performances in historical costumes, marching bands and floats, referring to contemporary and historical events. There is also a funfair, accompanied by several pole marquees, as well as much revelling in the bars, cafes and pubs of the city.

=== Brunnenfest ===
On the last Sunday of the summer holidays, the traditional Brunnenfest (fountain party) takes place in the city centre. A street party, it is concentrated on the Upper and Lower Market Square. The name of the event derives from the Neptune-fountain, situated in the Upper Market Square. A great number of stalls serves Swabian and international cuisine as well as a large variety of beverages. The stalls are organised and staffed by local clubs. Concert bands, Jazz bands and Volksmusik bands entertain visitors. On a stage dance and sport performances are shown. Additionally, a flea market is held at the same time.

=== Other ===
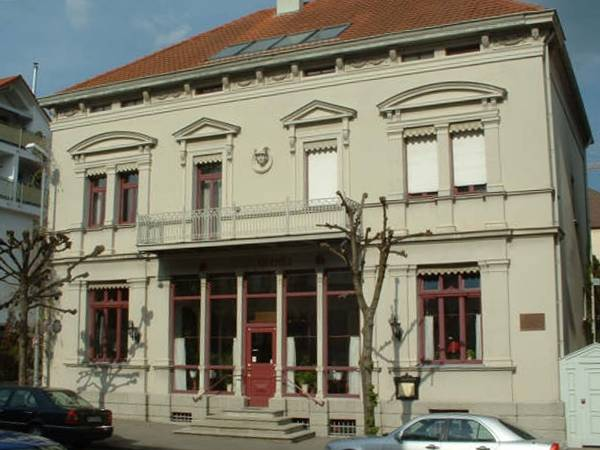
Cafe Hermes

- Laupheim is situated on the Upper Swabian Baroque Route, a touristic route along the most notable architectural remains of Baroque-style in Upper Swabia.
- Jugendstil Cafe Hermes on Kapellenstraße, birthplace of Friedrich Adler.

== Sport ==
- FV Olympia Laupheim 1904: football club, currently playing in the 6th division (Verbandsliga Württemberg).
- Rot-Weiss Laupheim: handball club
- Karateverein Laupheim: karate club
- Schachclub Laupheim 1962: chess club.
- Schützenverein Laupheim 1864: shooting club for handguns and rifles.
- Segelclub Laupheim: sailing club.
- Taekwondo Laupheim: taekwondo club.
- Tanzclub Schloß Laupheim: ballroom dancing club
- Tauchsportgruppe Laupheim: diving club
- Tennisclub Laupheim 1904: tennis club
- TSV Laupheim 1862: sport club with several sub-divisions

== Honorary citizens ==
- Carl Laemmle (17 January 1867 – 24 September 1939), German-American film producer (All Quiet on the Western Front), founder of Universal Studios.
- Anton Schmid (24 June 1864 – 25 August 1964), headmaster.
- Georg Schenk (14 December 1894 – 25 December 1971), teacher and local historian.
- Father Ivo Schaible SDS (8 July 1912 – 13 September 1990), artist.
- Dean Philipp Ruf (8 November 1900 – ?), dean of Catholic church in Laupheim.
- Josef Braun (6 September 1910 – 2003), deputy headmaster, historian.
- Otmar Schick (8 September 1935 – 23 November 2016), mayor from 1966 – 2002.
- Ernst Schäll (18 March 1927 – 28 October 2010), restorer of physical Jewish heritage in Laupheim.
- Brigitte Angele (born 1946), former member of the city council.
- Franz Romer (26 February 1942 - 2 February 2024) in Untersulmetingen, politician (CDU), former member of the Bundestag.

== Notable people from Laupheim ==
- Wilhelm Biener (1590–1651), a lawyer, and chancellor of Tyrol, executed for treason and embezzlement.
- Ludwig von Welden (1780–1853), commander-in-chief of Austrian Imperial and Royal Army's artillery.
- Kilian von Steiner (1833–1903), banker and industrialist.
- Leopold Treitel, classical scholar, and last rabbi of the Jewish community in Laupheim.
- Moritz Henle (1850–1925), cantor and composer of Jewish reform movement.
- Carl Laemmle (1867–1939), film producer, founder of Universal Studios.
- Franz Laub (DE Wiki) (1872–1945), composer, music director of the city, music director of the music federation of Upper Swabia.
- Friedrich Adler (1878–1943), Jugendstil and Art Deco designer; murdered in Auschwitz.
- Franz Pfender (1899–1972), politician, Centre Party and Christian Democratic Union.
- Ivo Schaible (1912–1990), a German Catholic priest and artist.
- Hugo Mann (1913–2008), retail entrepreneur.
- Siegfried Einstein (1919–1983), author, poet and journalist.
- Gertrud Zelinsky (DE Wiki) (born 1937), author.
- Ivo Gönner (born 1952), former Lord Mayor of Ulm.
- Hermann Gaub (DE Wiki) (born 1954), biophysicist.
- Thorsten Wollmann, (DE Wiki) (born 1966), jazz musician and composer.
- Sandra Hoffmann, (DE Wiki) (born 1967), writer.
- Anja Reinalter (born 1970), politician, Alliance 90/The Greens.
- Maja Weber (DE Wiki) (born 1976), journalist and news presenter.

=== Sport ===
- Sepp Uhlmann (1902–1968), Olympic fencer and entrepreneur.
- Gretel Bergmann (1914–2017), well renowned high jumper of the 1930s, excluded from the 1936 Olympic team for being a Jew.
- Philip Türpitz (born 1991), professional footballer, played over 380 games
- Oskari Paldanius (born 2007), Finnish tennis player

== See also ==
- Upper Swabia
- Upper Swabian Baroque Route
- Laupheim Air Base
- History of the Jews in Germany
