= Friedrich Adler (artist) =

Jewish-German designer

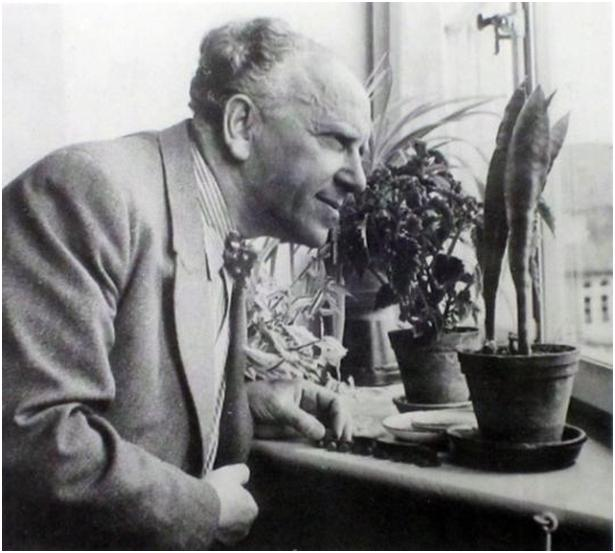
- Friedrich Adler in the 1930s
- Born: April 29, 1878; Laupheim, Germany
- Died: c. 11 July 1942; Auschwitz, German-occupied Poland
- Education: Academy of Fine Arts, Munich
- Known for: Product design
- Movement: Art Nouveau, Art Deco
- Spouses: Bertha Haymann; Erika Fabisch
- Children: 7

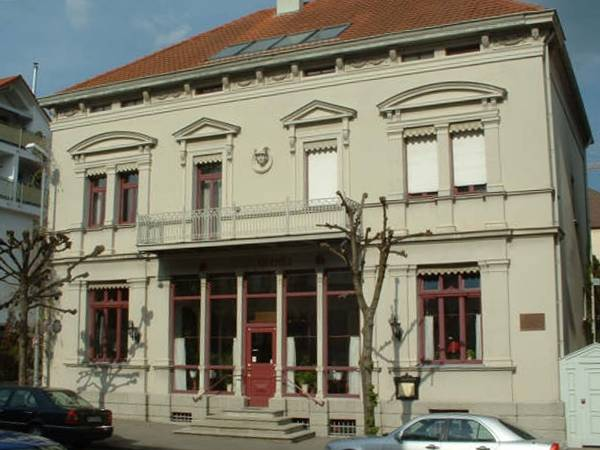
Birthplace of Friedrich Adler in Laupheim, Germany

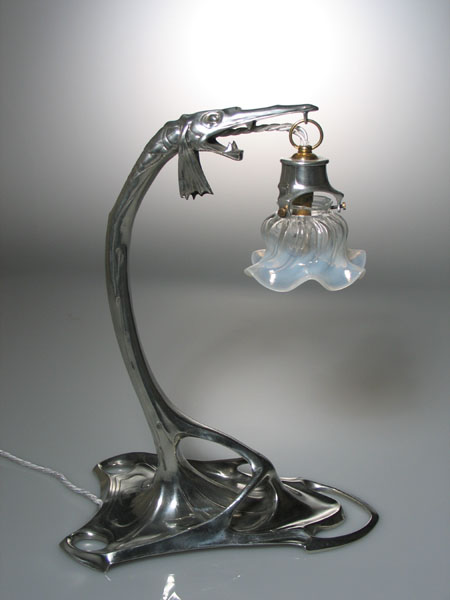
Art nouveau lamp

Friedrich Adler (29 April 1878 – c. 11 July 1942) was a Jewish-German artist, designer and academic. He was renowned for his accomplishments in designing metalwork in the Art Nouveau and Art deco styles; he was also the first designer to use bakelite. He designed using a wide variety of objects and materials.

== Biography ==
Adler was born on 29 April 1878 in Laupheim, Germany to parents Karoline Frieda Sommer and pastry shop owner Isidor Adler. His birthplace is now the Café Hermes, an Art nouveau building in the style of the late Italian Renaissance. From 1894 to 1898 he studied at the Munich School of Applied Arts (now known as Academy of Fine Arts, Munich). In 1902, Adler decided to undertake a second degree at the new teaching and research institute for applied and free art called Debschitz School studying under Wilhelm von Debschitz and the sculptor Hermann Obrist. By 1903, he was teaching stucco technology at the same Debschitz School.

From 1907 to 1914, and again from 1918 to 1933, he taught at the School for Applied Art in Hamburg (with a break in between for his military service during World War I).

He drew closer to the Jewish religion as well as Jewish iconography and art, as Nazism grew. He designed two stained glass windows for the synagogue in his hometown. In 1914, for the Cologne Werkbund exhibition he designed the interior of a Jewish house of worship.

After serving in World War I from 1914 until 1918, changes in Adler's design work occurred and he stopped working in the Art Nouveau style. In his later life he focused on batik and fabric printing, opening the, Adler Textildruckgesellschaft Hamburg (Adler Textile Printing Company Hamburg). In between, he also directed the mastery lessons in Nuremberg, and was busy designing pieces in applied art for over fifty clients.

=== Death and legacy ===
On 11 July 1942, Adler, who was Jewish, was deported to the extermination camp Auschwitz, where, judged too old to work, he was murdered soon afterwards. There is a stolperstein in his memory at his last place of employment in Hamburg.

In 1994, he was honored with a retrospective exhibition at Munich Stadtmuseum (Munich City Museum). Alder's work is included in the museum collection at the Metropolitan Museum of Art.

== Personal life ==
In 1907, Adler married Bertha Haymann, who died of Spanish flu in 1918. With Bertha he had five children, one of which was artist Paul "Pollo" Wilhelm Adler (1915–1944) who was murdered at Auschwitz.

In 1920, Adler married a former student, Erika Fabisch, and together they had two children. In 1934, Erika Fabisch left with the children to Cyprus.
