= Gottfried Ephraim Scheibel =

Gottfried Ephraim Scheibel (1696–1759) was a German theologian and writer about music.

Scheibel studied theology in Leipzig and from 1736 taught at the Elizabeth-Gymnasium in his home town of Breslau.

Scheibel's most famous treatise, Zufällige Gedancken von der Kirchenmusic (Random Thoughts about Church Music), was published in 1721. It presents a strong defense of the role of music in the Lutheran Church service, in particular music derived from opera. By way of example, he demonstrates the use of the parody technique—replacing secular texts with sacred ones, while keeping the music the same—using the music of Georg Philipp Telemann.

== Writings ==
- Zufällige Gedancken von der Kirchenmusic, wie sie heutiges Tages beschaffen ist (Frankfurt and Leipzig, 1721) Facsimile Edition
- Poetische Andachten Uber alle gewöhnliche Sonn- und Fest-Tage, durch das ganze Jahr (Leipzig and Breslau, 1725) Online
- Musicalisch-poetische andächtige Betrachtungen über alle Sonn- und Fest-Tags Evangelien durchs gantze Jahr (Breslau, 1726, 2/1738) Online
- Das bestürmte Oels, oder das im Jahr Christi 1535, den 1. September am Tage Aegidii entstandene grosse Ungewitter in der Hoch-Fürstlichen Residenz-Stadt Oels, allen seinen merckwürdigen Umständen nach mit poetischer Feder nach Art eines Helden-Gedichts beschrieben (Breslau, 1727)
- Die unerkannte Sünden der Poeten, welche man sowohl in ihren Schrifften als in ihrem Leben wahrnimmt, nach den Regeln des Christenthums und vernünfftiger Sittenlehre geprüfet (Leipzig: Teubner, 1734)
- Die Geschichte der Kirchen-Music alter und neuer Zeiten (Breslau: Korn, 1738) Online
- Die Witterungen. Ein historisch- und physikalisches Gedicht (Breslau: Meyer, 1752)

== Bibliography ==
- George J. Buelow, "Scheibel, Gottfried Ephraim," in Grove Music Online.
- Robert Eitner, "Scheibel, Gottfried Ephraim," in Biographisch-Bibliographisches Quellen-Lexikon der Musiker (1903).
- Scheibel, Gottfried Ephraim. “Random Thoughts About Church Music in Our Day.” In Bach's Changing World: Voices in the Community, edited by Carol Baron, translated by Joyce Irwin, 227–249. Rochester NY: University of Rochester Press, 2006.
