= Rentschler (company) =

Biopharma CDMO

Rentschler Biopharma SE
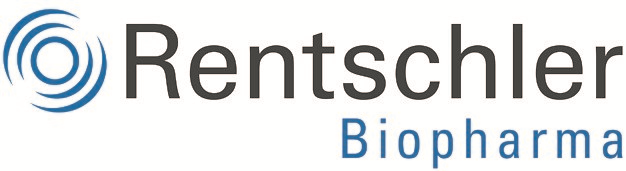
- Company type: SE
- Industry: CDMO for Biopharma
- Founded: 1872
- Headquarters: Laupheim, Germany
- Key people: Benedikt von Braunmuehl, Dr. Christian Schetter, Christiane Bardroff
- Number of employees: about 1300
- Website: https://www.rentschler-biopharma.com/
- Footnotes / references Last Update: November 07, 2023

Rentschler Biopharma SE is a contract development and manufacturing organization (CDMO). It is part of Dr. Rentschler Holding GmbH & Co. KG and its employees make up the majority of the 1300 workers employed by the parent organization.

Rentschler Biopharma SE is headquartered in Laupheim in the city of Biberach in Upper Swabia, Germany.

== Service ==
Rentschler Biopharma SE provides services for the production of biopharmaceuticals that include the areas of cell line and process development, GMP production, formulation, filling, analytics, quality control, regulatory affairs and quality assurance.

== History ==
The company's history dates back to 1872, when the pharmacist Gottlob Müller established a pharmacy in Laupheim, which he handed over to his son-in-law, pharmacist Erwin Rentschler, Sr., in 1909, and which continues to exist today as the "7-Schwaben-Apotheke". After 140 years of ownership by the Rentschler family, the pharmacy was sold in 2012.

On New Year's Eve 1923/24, pharmacist Erwin Rentschler, Jr., the son of Erwin Rentschler, Sr., created the basis for the group of companies that exists today. While on night duty, he had the idea for a new painkiller formula, which was marketed under the name "Melabon". As the pharmacy became too small to satisfy the demand for Melabon, Dr. Rentschler & Co. OHG was founded in 1927, with Erwin Rentschler, Jr. as managing director. Two years later, his brother, Dr. Helmut Rentschler, a pharmacist and chemist, also became managing partner, and together they headed the young company, which was initially based on a single therapeutic. Over time, other non-prescription medicines were added, establishing an almost 80-year tradition. In 1947, the first product diversification took place with the founding of the Warthausen Bacteriological Institute, which was dedicated to the development and production of veterinary vaccines.

After the death of Erwin Rentschler, Jr. in 1959, his son, Friedrich Erwin Rentschler, took over the management. He successfully expanded the portfolio of over-the-counter preparations with new prescription products, mainly in the cardiovascular field. In 1974, he created the Biotechnology Division and began developing interferons, which led in 1983, to Rentschler receiving the world's first approval for a natural interferon-beta therapeutic, which was sold under the brand name, Fiblaferon. In 1993, all biotechnology activities were merged into Rentschler Biotechnologie GmbH, which from 1997 onwards focused all business activities on services for the development of biopharmaceutical products.

One year after Friedrich E. Rentschler handed over the management of the company to his son, Nikolaus F. Rentschler, in 1999, the company began to expand its biotechnology activities and focus all business activities in this area. In 2003, the group of companies was restructured under Rentschler Holding GmbH & Co. KG. Rentschler Biotechnologie GmbH represents the largest operational share. The expansion of biotechnology that began in 2000 was continued, and by 2010, nine units were available for the GMP production of biopharmaceuticals for clinical development and for commercial supply. Nikolaus would later succeed his father as the Chairman of the Supervisory Board in January 2016.

In October 2017, Rentschler Biotechnologie GmbH changed its name to Rentschler Biopharma SE. The first step in the internationalization of the company followed in January 2019 with the acquisition of a former Baxalta production facility in the greater Boston area in Milford, MA, USA. The Rentschler Biopharma Manufacturing Center US (RBMC US) is being built adjacent to the existing site in Milford, which will provide additional capacity for cGMP production. The new site will add cleanroom space of approximately 2,050 m^{2} (22,066 ft^{2}), and the highly automated facility will feature four new 2,000-liter (528 gal) single-use bioreactors. The focus of the new facility will be on the commercial production of complex molecules for clients in the US.

In the summer of 2020, Rentschler Biopharma became involved in the production of the world's first approved mRNA vaccine. On behalf of BioNTech, Rentschler Biopharma was responsible for the purification of the mRNA for the COVID-19 vaccine, Comirnaty. Rentschler Biopharma was involved in the production of more than one billion vaccine doses.

In February 2021, Rentschler ATMP Ltd. was founded in the UK as a center of excellence for cell and gene therapy, to offer capacity for the development and production of advanced therapy medicinal products (ATMPs).

== Public-private engagement ==
Rentschler Biopharma SE, along with its parent organization Dr. Rentschler Holding GmbH & Co. KG and the Rentschler family, engages with the public and private sectors via academic funding and philanthropy. They have participated in volunteer and civic projects in Laupheim, and the surrounding area, including in Ulm with the Albert Einstein Discovery Center, and in Biberach with the University of Applied Sciences.
