= Untersulmetingen =

- Stadtteil of Laupheim
- Interactive map of Untersulmetingen
- Location within Germany Location within Baden-Württemberg
- Coordinates: 48°13′49″N 9°49′44″E
- Country: Germany
- State: Baden-Württemberg
- Admin. region: Tübingen
- District: Biberach
- Town: Laupheim
- Elevation: 497 m (1,631 ft)

Population (2018)
  - Total: 2,071
- Time zone: UTC+01:00 (CET)
  - Summer (DST): UTC+02:00 (CEST)
- Postal codes: 88471
- Dialling codes: 07392

Untersulmetingen is a village which is part of the municipality of Laupheim, in the state of Baden-Württemberg, Germany.

== Geography ==
Besides the village itself, the hamlets Westerflach and Niederkirch belong to its administration. Most of Untersulmetingen is located to the west of the river Riss which flows into the river Danube about 9 kilometres to the north of the village. Untersulmetingen Castle is situated in the village.

== History ==
The first documentary evidence of Sulmetingen dates from 853. Sulmetingen was divided into Untersulmetingen and its neighbour village Obersulmetingen in 1441.
