= Ivo Schaible =

German Catholic priest (1912–1990)

Father Ivo Schaible SDS (born Josef Schaible; 8 July 1912 – 13 September 1990), was a German Catholic priest and artist.

== Life ==
Ivo Schaible was born Josef Schaible in the Upper Swabian town of Baustetten, today a part of Laupheim, Baden-Württemberg. At the age of eleven, he went to a boarding school run by the Salvatorian Order, also known as the Society of the Divine Saviour, in Lochau near Bregenz on Lake Constance. On taking his Orders he became known as Ivo Schaible. After his ordination into the priesthood in 1939, he was conscripted as a chaplain into the German Armed Forces. He was captured and spent some time in a prisoner of war camp. At the end of the Second World War, he got permission from his Order to study art. He attended the Munich Academy of Fine Arts between 1946 and 1951 and studied under Franz Nagel. In 1951, on graduating from the Academy he was sent by his Order to Bogotá, Colombia as an artist and missionary and where he stayed until 1964. During his time in Colombia, he was responsible for designing and creating all the religious artwork for several churches including stained glass windows, paintings, tabernacle and sculptures. His artistic oeuvre and interests flourished during his time in Colombia, where photographed, painted secular landscapes and portraits. He was also the assisting artist on several scientific research expeditions focused on insects in the jungle. He was renowned for travelling with his Hasselblad camera and always wearing a typical Colombian hat called a 'Sombrero Vueltiao'.

Schaible returned to Munich in 1964 to live and work in the monastery and parish church St. Willibald (Munich). He continued to work as an artist for the Salvatorians creating paintings, sculptures, mosaics and stained glass windows for churches in southern Germany and Austria. His art studio is now a museum at St. Willibald church complex in Munich.

Schaible died on 13 September 1990 in Munich. The requiem took place on 19 September 1990 and was celebrated in the church of St. Willibald in Munich by Emil Stehle., the bishop of Santo Domingo de los Colorados in Ecuador. A room is dedicated to Ivo Schaible in the Museum of the History of Christians and Jews in Laupheim, Germany.

== Work ==
List of works by E. Schäll:

- Twenty-four stained-glass windows, Divino Salvador church in Bogotá, Colombia, 1962
- Stained glass window, Church of Santo Domingo de los Colorados, Ecuador, 1990
- Glass window, Ochsenhausen Hospital Chapel, 1986
- Glass windows, St. Oswald Chapel, Waldhausen, 1986
- Glass windows, Hall of the Blessed, Baustetten, 1987
- Glass windows, Salvator School, Vienna-Kaisermühlen 1972
- Glass windows, St. Florian, Mistelbach-Lanzendorf, Lower Austria, 1970
- Stained Glass Window, Sisters of the Poor Child Jesus, Bosa, Cundinamarca, Colombia, c. 1959
- Glass window, Gartlberg Chapel, Lower Bavaria 1968
- Glass windows, Salvator College, Lochau, Vorarlberg 1967 (?)
- Stained glass window, Ettal Monastery Chapel 1968
- Stained glass, Parish Church of the Salesian Order, Rio Negro, Colombia, c. 1962
- Church portal bronze, parish church Altheim, Württenburg 1965
- Wurzacher bronze door handles, Wurzach Secondary School.
- Casein icon "Mater Salvatoris" (Patrona Bavariae), Gartlberg Monastery Chapel, Pfarrkirchen Niederbayern
- Wall fresco behind altar, St. Michael, Bogotá, parish church of the German Catholics in Colombia, 1964
- Wall fresco behind altar, Lochau boarding school, Vorarlberg, Austria 1967
- Overall design of the church interior, architectural-sacral-artistic, St. Florian, Mistelbach-Lanzendorf, Lower Austria 1970
- Madonna in the oak, pilgrimage church Maria Eich pilgrimage church, Planegg near Munich, 1968
- Madonna in linden wood, Maximilian Kolbe Church, Münster, Westphalia, 1967
- Enthroned cedar wood sculpture, Divino Salvador Parish Church, Bogotá, Colombia, 1957
- Pietà from oak, crypt St. Willibald, Munich-Laim, 1970.
- St. Michael sculpture, artificial stone, facade of the parish church of the German Catholics in Colombia, Bogotá, 1963.
- Oswald fountain, front of the chapel, Waldhausen/Altheim, Württ.
- Johannes Brunnen Gemeindeplatz, Altheim, Württ.

== Gallery ==
=== Bronze ===
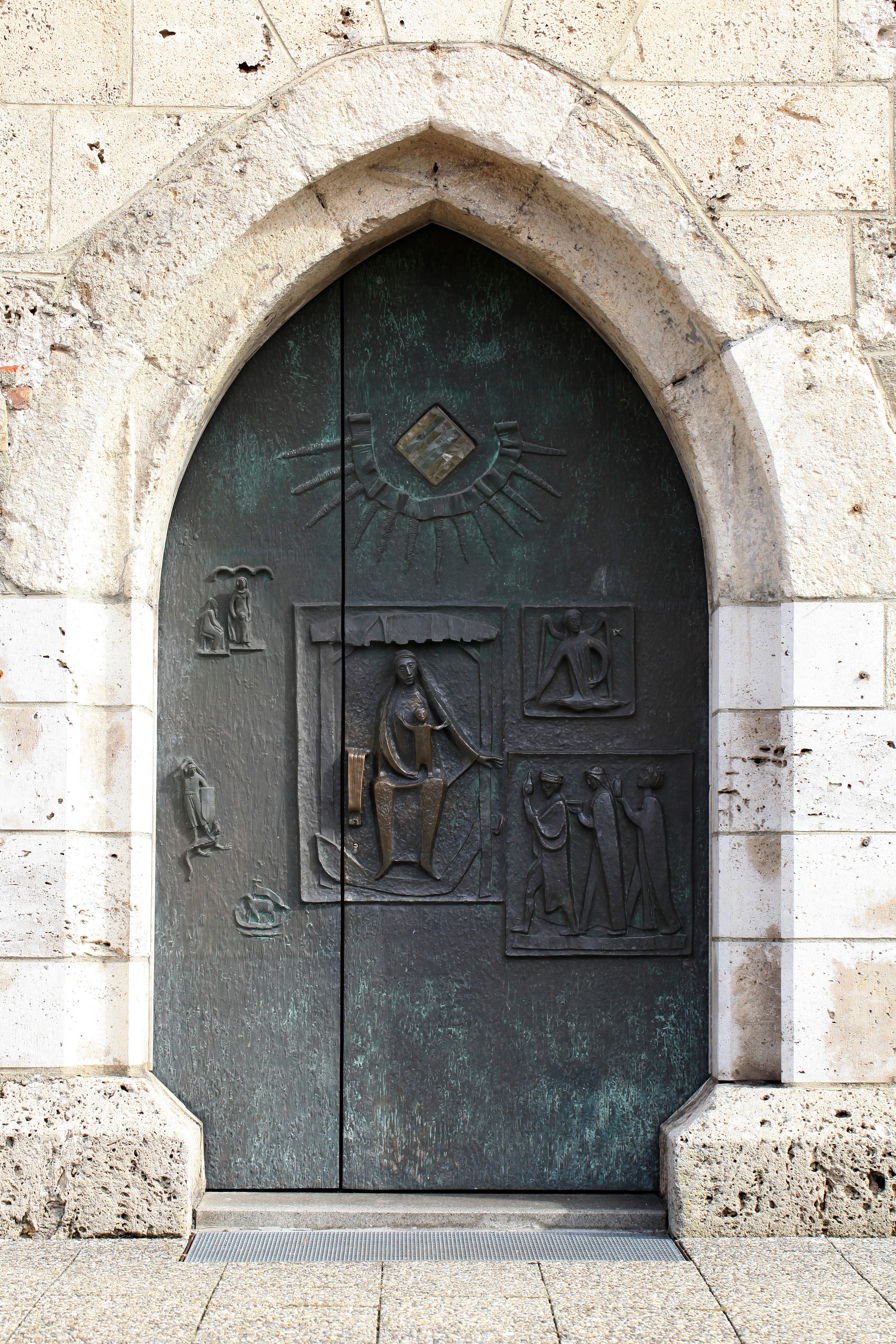
Pfarrkirche Altheim: Marienportal (inaugurated 12.11.1978) Photo: Ulrich Gresser, Bad Wurzach

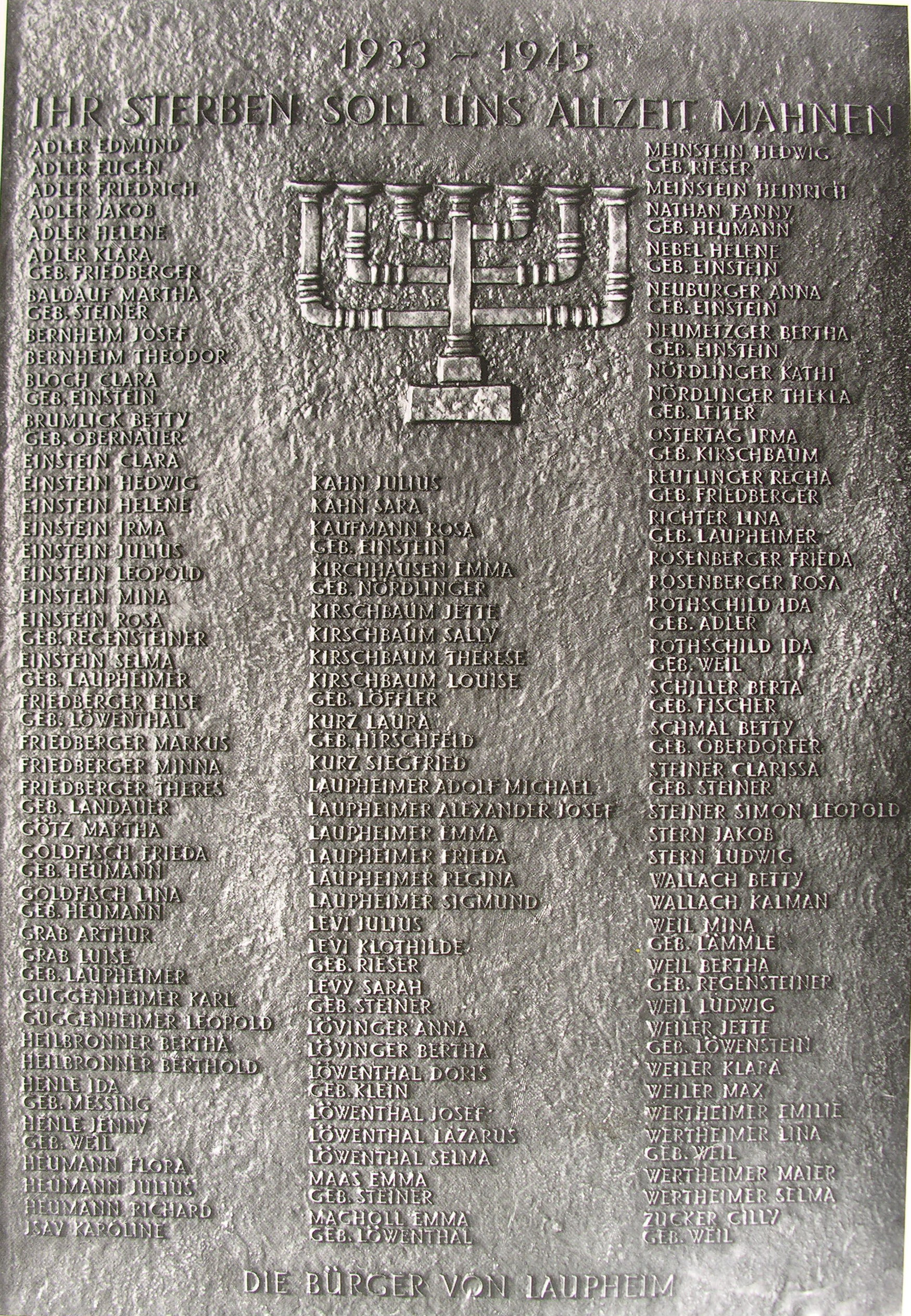
Jewish Cemetery Laupheim: Commemorative plaque

=== Stained glass windows ===
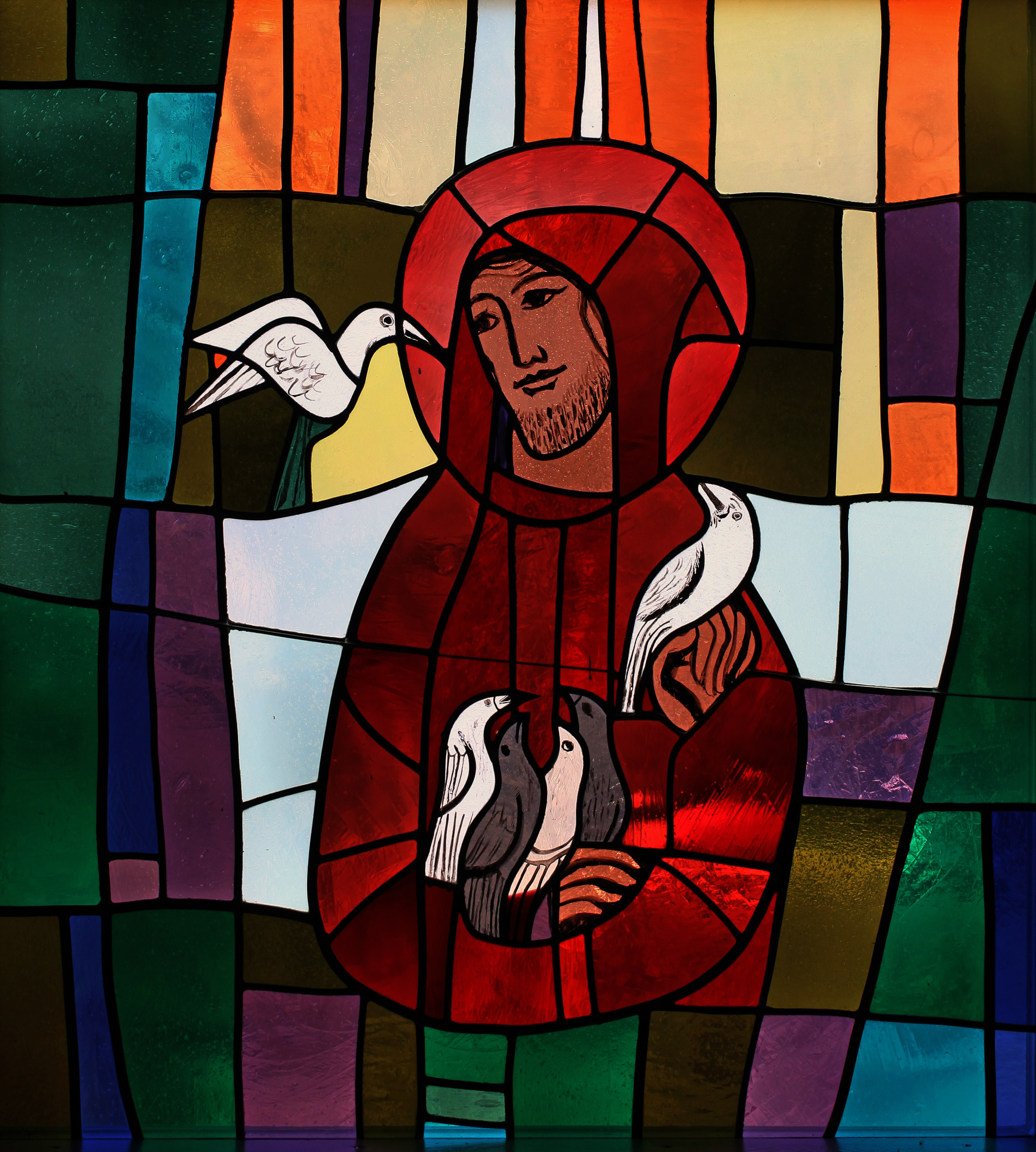
Ochsenhausen Hospital Chapel: Stained glass window (detail) (1986) Photo: Ulrich Gresser, Bad Wurzach

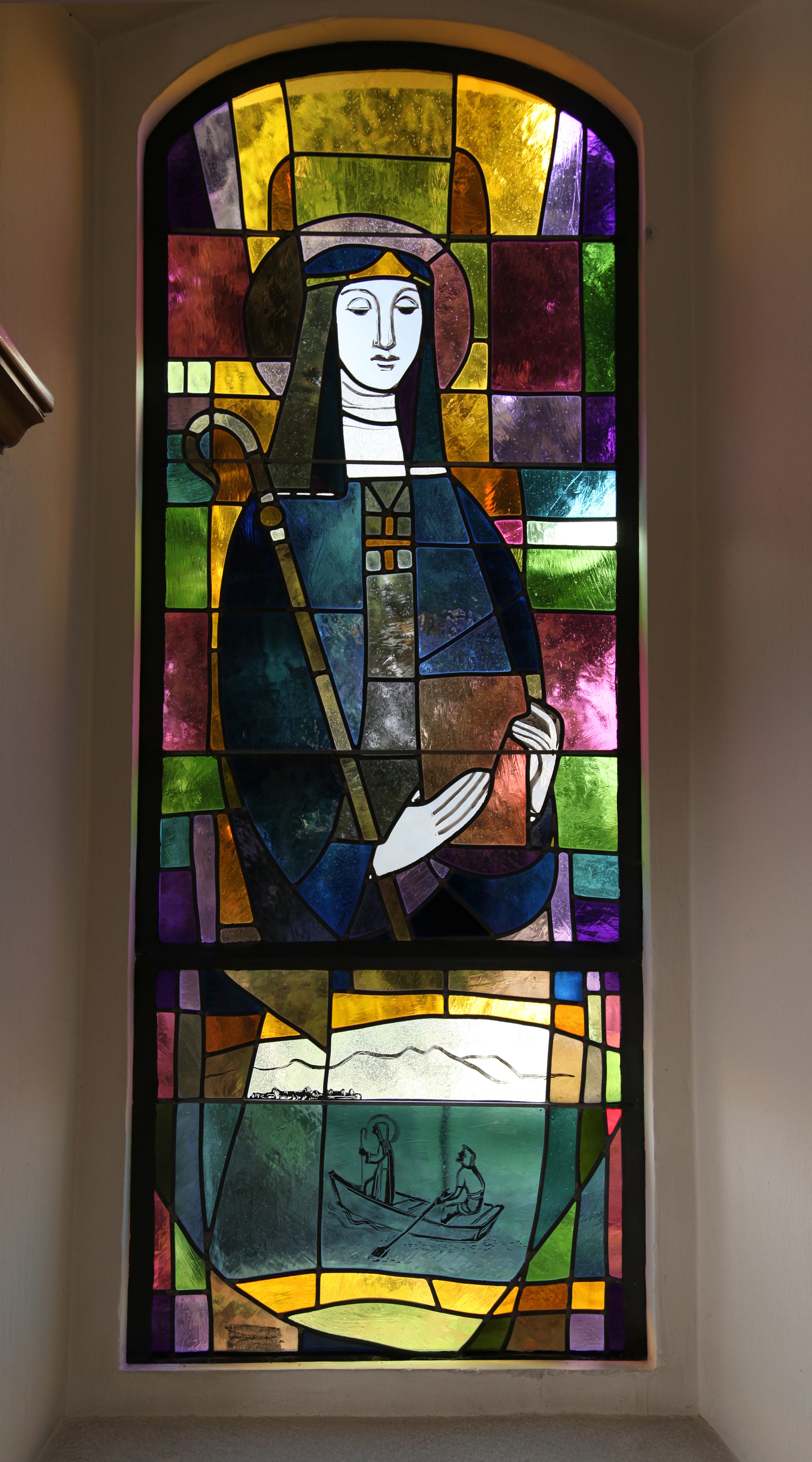
St. Oswald Church, Waldhausen b. Altheim: Stained glass window (1986) Photo: Ulrich Gresser, Bad Wurzach

=== Other ===
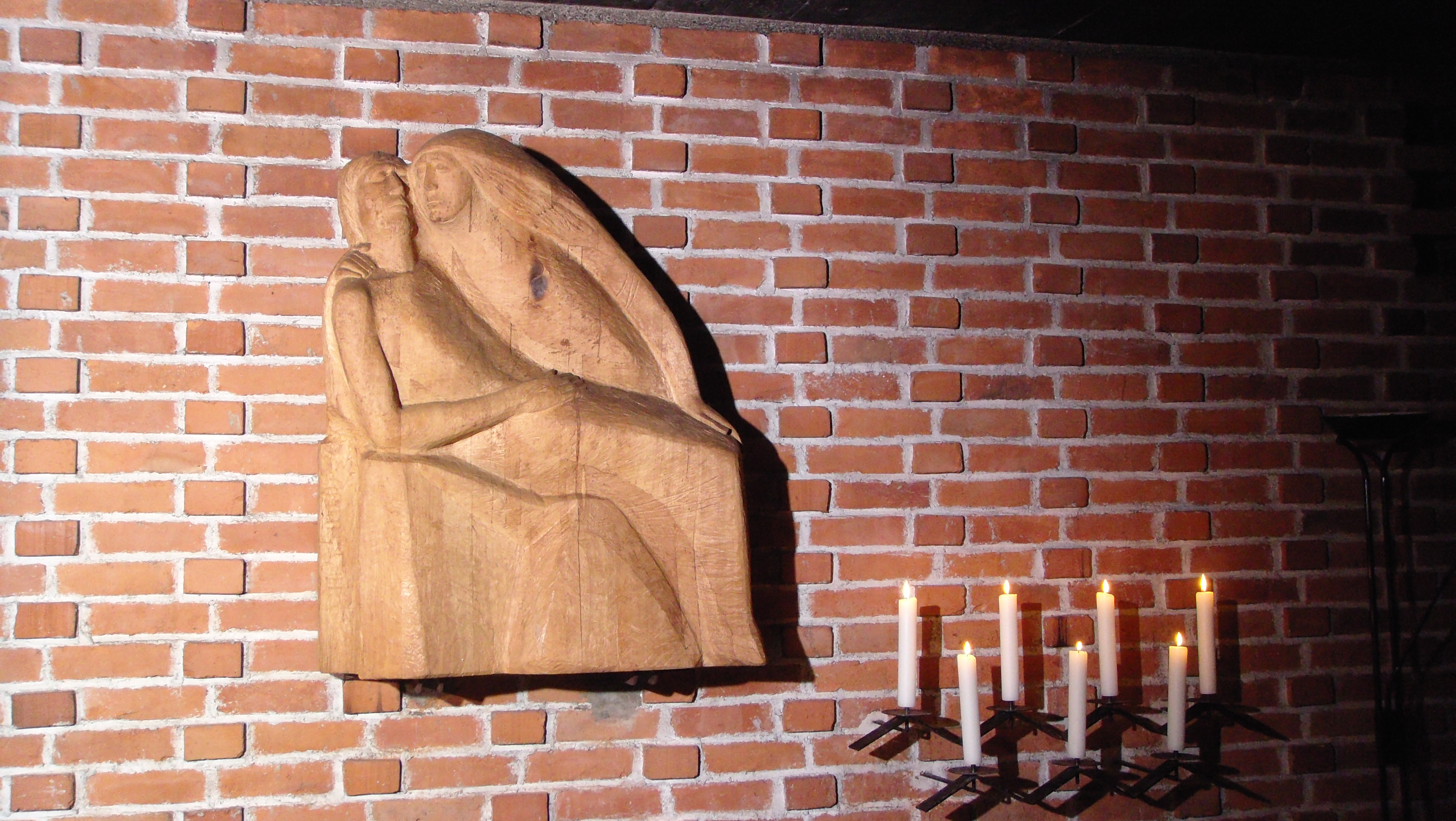
St. Willibald Church Munich: Oakwood Pietà in Crypt (1970)

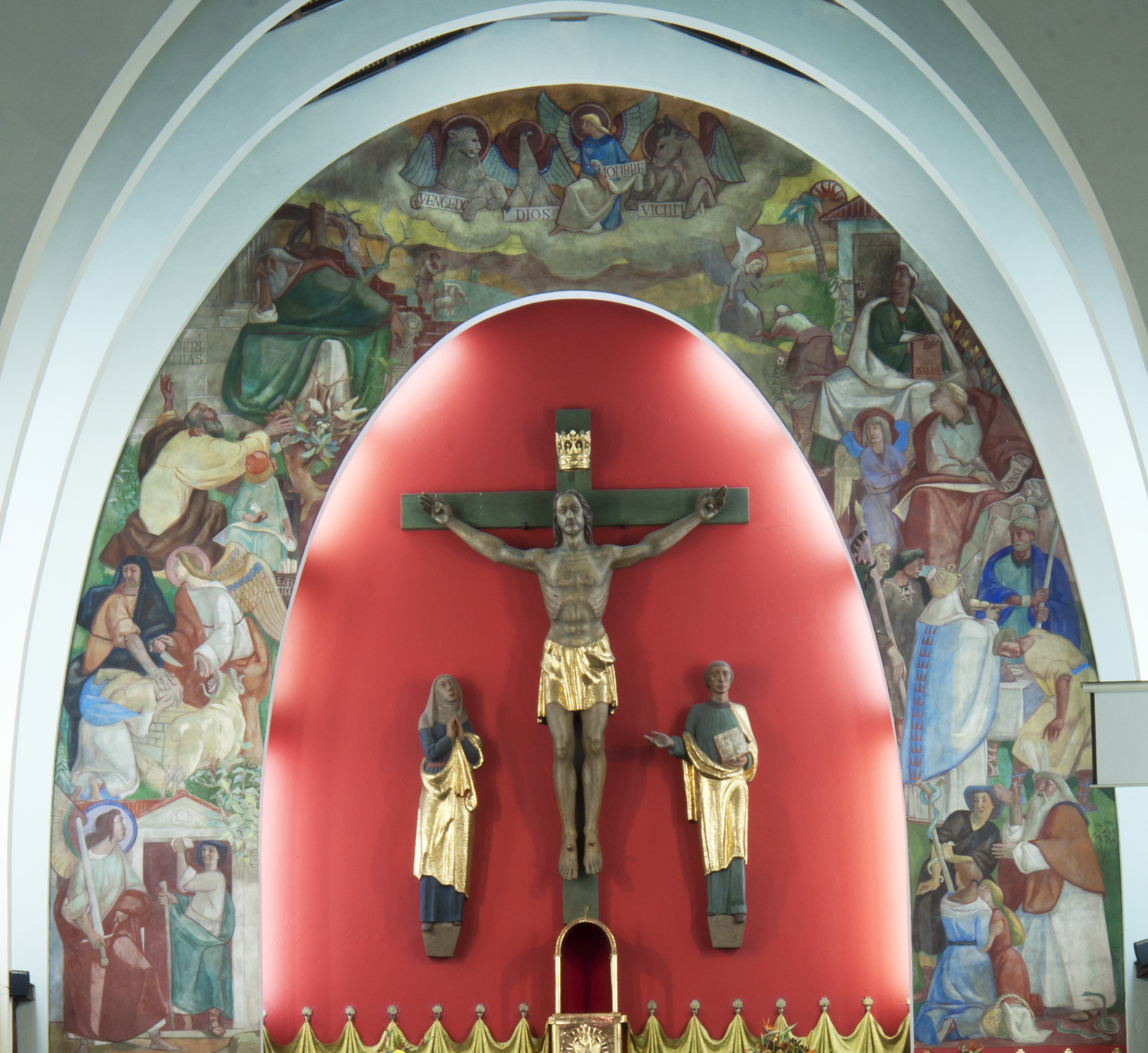
Church of the Divino Salvador, Bogotá: Choir

== Awards ==
- 1960 Federal Cross of Merit by the German ambassador in Colombia.
- 1968 Honorary citizen of the Laupheim, Baustetten
- Ivo-Schaible-Schule Elementary School in Baustetten

== Literature ==
- Günther Mayer: Türen zum Leben. 1987.
- Günther Mayer: Die Triptychen von P. Ivo Schaible SDS. ca. 2005.
- Michael Schatz: Ivo Schaible : Kolumbianisches Zeichenbuch. Schahl Kunstverlag, Grünwald 2012, ISBN 978-3-9815186-2-7.
- Günther Mayer: Ivo Schaible - Bilder des Heils. Schahl Kunstverlag, Grünwald 2012, ISBN 978-3-9815186-0-3.
- Günther Mayer: Ivo Schaible - Das Marienportal in Altheim. Schahl Kunstverlag, Grünwald 2012, ISBN 978-3-9815186-1-0.
- R. J. Praetorius: Ivo Schaible - Mit der Rohrfeder durch Italien. Pullach 1985, ISBN 3-9800646-0-3.
- Ernst Schäll: Pater Professor Ivo Schaible — Ordensmann und Schöpfer bedeutender sakraler Kunstwerke. In: Heimatkundliche Blätter für den Kreis Biberach. 4. Jahrgang, Heft 2 vom 18. Dezember 1981.
- Ernst Schäll: Ivo Schaible - Der Künstler und sein Werk. Pullach 1987, ISBN 3-9800646-1-1.
- Günther Mayer: Ivo Schaible - Marienlob in Santo Domingo, Ecuador. Schahl Kunstverlag, Grünwald 2014, ISBN 978-3-9815186-4-1.
- Günther Mayer: Ivo Schaible - Elogio a María en Santo Domingo, Ecuador. Schahl Kunstverlag, Grünwald 2014, ISBN 978-3-9815186-5-8.
- Günther Mayer: Ivo Schaible - Der Kreuzweg in Lochau-Vorarlberg. Schahl Kunstverlag, Grünwald 2014, ISBN 978-3-9815186-6-5.
- Michael Schatz: Ivo Schaible - Dibujos de Colombia. Schahl Kunstverlag, Grünwald 2015. ISBN 978-3-9815186-3-4

(Detailed bilingual review (German and Spanish) by Reinhard Kaufmann in "Kolumbien Aktuell" Juli 2015.)

== DVDs ==
Published by Hera and Richard Schahl video production, Grünwald, Germany.

- Ivo Schaible SDS – Ausstellung weltlicher und sakraler Werke St.Willibald, München. Production Alexe Tudor 1999.
- Ivo Schaible SDS – Baustetter Fest 2001. Production Alexe Tudor 2001. Ivo Schaible SDS – Zeichen des Glaubens und der Kunst. Gesamtgestaltung Alexe Tudor 2001.
- Ivo Schaible SDS – Gesamtarchiv. Production Alexe Tudor 2002.
- Ivo Schaible SDS – Mit Rohrfeder und Fotokamera durch Italien. Production Alexe Tudor 2003.
- Die Begegnung – P. Günther Mayer SDS trifft P. Ivo Schaible SDS, Production Alexe Tudor 2003.
- Ivo Schaible SDS – Schloss Großlaupheim, Museum zur Geschichte von Christen und Juden. Video Report Alexe Tudor 2006.
- DVD-Collection of 8 DVDs about Ivo Schaible, interviews with his contemporaries and a video Catalogue Raissone of his work, Production Alexe Tudor 2012.

Published by d3 media:

- Ivo Schaible SDS – Kolumbianische Skizzen, Kolumbien 1963–1964, d3 media 2006. Ivo Schaible SDS – Esbozos Colombianos, Colombia 1963–1964, d3 media 2006.
