= Ulm (Landtag electoral district) =

State electoral district of Germany

64: Ulm
- Electoral district for the Landtag of Baden-Württemberg
- Ulm in 2026
- District: Ulm and Alb-Donau-Kreis (partial)
- Electorate: 122,765 (2026)
- Major settlements: Ulm, Balzheim, Blaustein, Dietenheim, Erbach, Hüttisheim, Illerkirchberg, Illerrieden, Schnürpflingen, and Staig

Current electoral district
- Party: CDU
- Member: Mario Schneider

Ulm is an electoral constituency (German: Wahlkreis) represented in the Landtag of Baden-Württemberg.

Since 2026, it has elected one member via first-past-the-post voting. Voters cast a second vote under which additional seats are allocated proportionally state-wide. Under the constituency numbering system, it is designated as constituency 64.

It is split between the city of Ulm and the district of Alb-Donau-Kreis.

== Geography ==
The constituency incorporates the entirety of the city of Ulm, and the districts of Balzheim, Blaustein, Dietenheim, Erbach, Hüttisheim, Illerkirchberg, Illerrieden, Schnürpflingen, and Staig within the district of Alb-Donau-Kreis.

There were 122,765 eligible voters in 2026.

== Members ==
=== First mandate ===
Both prior to and since the electoral reforms for the 2026 election, the winner of the plurality of the vote (first-past-the-post) in every constituency won the first mandate.

Election	Member	Party	%
1976	Ernst Ludwig	CDU	
1980	Ernst Ludwig	CDU	
1984	Karl Göbel	CDU	
1988	Karl Göbel	CDU	
1992	Karl Göbel	CDU	
1996	Karl Göbel	CDU	
2001	Monika Stolz	CDU	44.6
2006	Monika Stolz	CDU	44.8
2011	Monika Stolz	CDU	38.6
2016	Jürgen Filius	Grüne	33.0
2021	Michael Joukov	Grüne	36.5
2026	Mario Schneider	CDU	33.3

=== Second mandate ===
Prior to the electoral reforms for the 2026 election, the seats in the state parliament were allocated proportionately amongst parties which received more than 5% of valid votes across the state. The seats that were won proportionally for parties that did not win as many first mandates as seats they were entitled to, were allocated to their candidates which received the highest proportion of the vote in their respective constituencies. This meant that following some elections, a constituency would have one or more members elected under a second mandate.

Prior to 2011, these second mandates were allocated to the party candidates who got the greatest number of votes, whilst from 2011-2021, these were allocated according to percentage share of the vote.

Election	Member	Party	Member	Party
1976	Rolf Dick	SPD		
1980	Eberhard Lorenz	SPD		
1984	Eberhard Lorenz	SPD		
1988	Eberhard Lorenz	SPD		
1992	Eberhard Lorenz	SPD		
1996	Eberhard Lorenz	SPD	Thomas Oelmayer	Grüne
2001	Martin Rivoir	SPD	Thomas Oelmayer	Grüne
2006	Martin Rivoir	SPD	Thomas Oelmayer	Grüne
2011	Martin Rivoir	SPD	Jürgen Filius	Grüne
2016	Martin Rivoir	SPD		
2021	Martin Rivoir	SPD		

== Election results ==
=== 2026 election ===
State election (2026): Ulm
Notes:	Blue background denotes the winner of the electorate vote. Pink background denotes a candidate elected from their party list. Yellow background denotes an electorate win by a list member, or other incumbent. A ✓ or ✗ denotes status of any incumbent, win or lose respectively.						
Party	Candidate	Votes	%	±%	Party votes	%	±%
CDU	Mario Schneider	28,172	33.3	▲10.5	24,196	28.5	▲5.7
Greens	✗ Michael Joukov	26,365	31.2	▼5.3	31,136	36.7	▲0.2
AfD	Daniel Rottmann	12,256	14.5	▲7.1	12,196	14.4	▲6.9
SPD	Steffen Reik	8,092	9.6	▼3.6	4,650	5.5	▼7.7
Left	Mustafa Süslü	4,495	5.3	▲1.0	4,129	4.9	▲0.6
FDP	Anke Hillmann-Richter	2,560	3.0	▼4.8	2,767	3.3	▼4.6
FW					1,434	1.7	▼0.8
APT	Bastian Röhm	1,233	1.5		1,057	1.2	
BSW	Uwe Hoffmann	961	1.1		1,119	1.3	
Volt					803	0.9	▲0.4
Pirates	Falk Hirschel	383	0.5	▼0.6			
PARTEI					322	0.4	
dieBasis					145	0.2	▼1.0
Values					136	0.2	
Team Todenhöfer					115	0.1	
KlimalisteBW					108	0.1	▼0.9
ÖDP					107	0.1	▼0.6
Bündnis C					95	0.1	
Pensioners					95	0.1	
PdF					66	0.1	
Humanists					55	0.1	
Verjüngungsforschung					42	0.0	▼0.3
Informal votes		631			375		
Total valid votes		84,517			84,773		
Turnout		85,148	69.4	▲5.9			
CDU gain from Greens	Majority	1,807	2.1				

== See also ==
- Politics of Baden-Württemberg
- Landtag of Baden-Württemberg
