= Staig =

- Municipality
- Coat of arms

- Location of Staig within Alb-Donau-Kreis district
- Interactive map of Staig
- Location within Germany Location within Baden-Württemberg
- Coordinates: 48°17′58″N 9°59′28″E
- Country: Germany
- State: Baden-Württemberg
- Admin. region: Tübingen
- District: Alb-Donau-Kreis

Government
  - Mayor (2024–32): Sascha Erlewein (CDU)

Area
  - Total: 17.75 km^{2} (6.85 sq mi)
- Elevation: 502 m (1,647 ft)

Population (2025-12-31)
  - Total: 3,322
  - Density: 187.2/km^{2} (484.7/sq mi)
- Time zone: UTC+01:00 (CET)
  - Summer (DST): UTC+02:00 (CEST)
- Postal codes: 89195
- Dialling codes: 07346
- Vehicle registration: UL
- Website: www.staig.de

Staig (German pronunciation: [ʃtaɪk]) is a municipality in the district of Alb-Donau in Baden-Württemberg in Germany. The community belongs to the Gemeindeverwaltungsverband-Kirchberg Weihungstal with headquarter in Illerkirchberg.

== Geography ==
Staig is located on the plateau between the Danube and Iller south of Ulm. The districts Steinberg and Altheim lying on the ridge of both sides of Weihung valley. The other districts are in the valley of the Weihungon or in a side valley. The community thus belongs to the landscape of the Holzstöcke.

== Neighboring communities ==
The municipality is bordering to the north to district Unterweiler of Ulm, on the east to Illerkirchberg, in the southeast to Illerrieden, on the south to Schnürpflingen and on the west to Hüttisheim.

== Municipality arrangement ==
The municipality Staig consists of the six districts Altheim, Essendorf, Harthausen, Staig, Steinberg and Weinstetten.

== History ==
Staig was first mentioned as "Steiga" in 1127, Altheim followed in 1194. The eldest district however is Harthausen, which appeared in a document already 1093. The other districts followed in the 14th century. On April 1, 1972, the municipality of Steinberg was incorporated into Weinstetten, which was renamed Staig on October 9, 1972. On January 1, 1976 Altheim ob Weihung was being added.

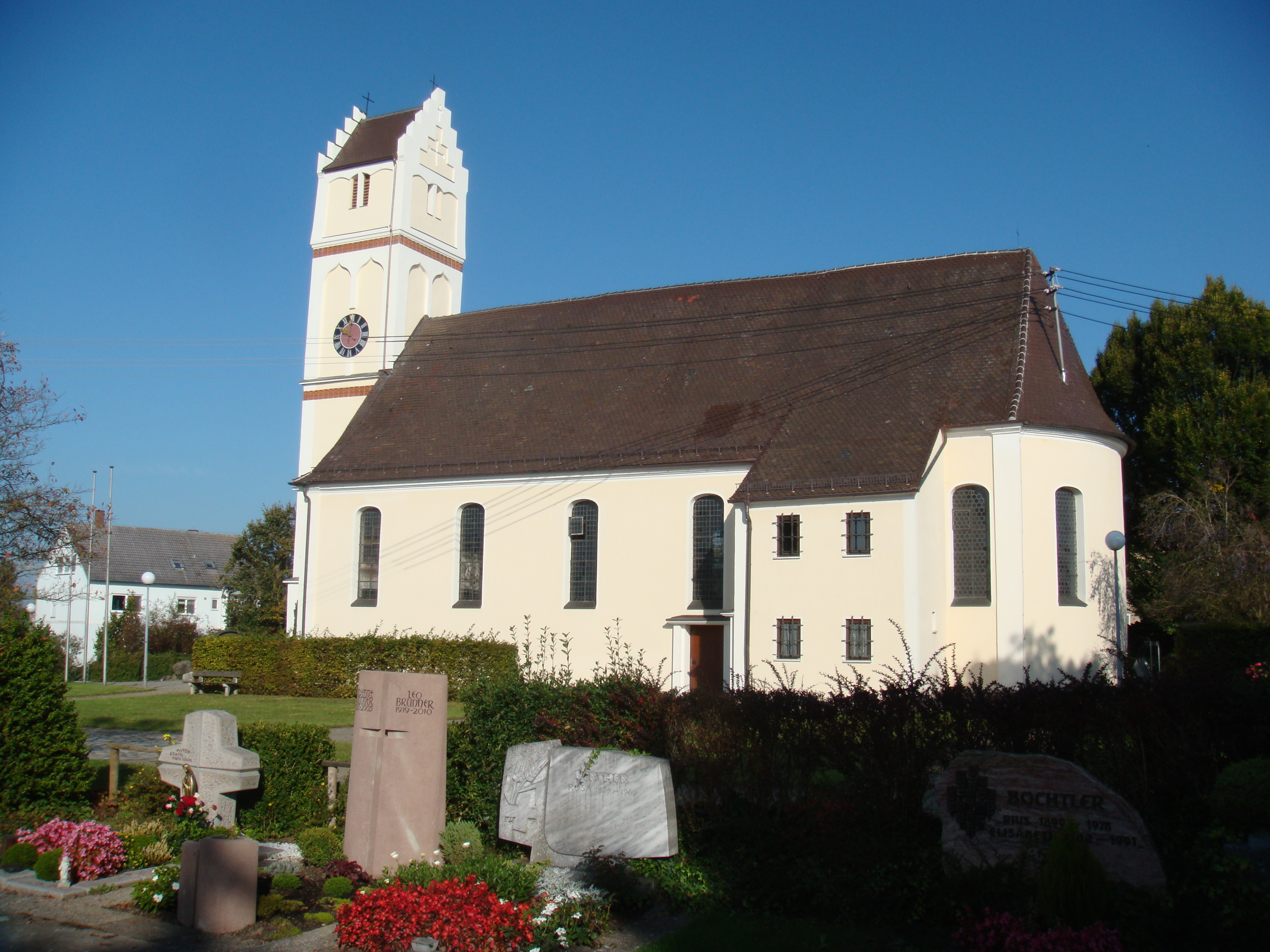
Church in Steinberg
