= Holzstöcke =

Mountain range in Germany

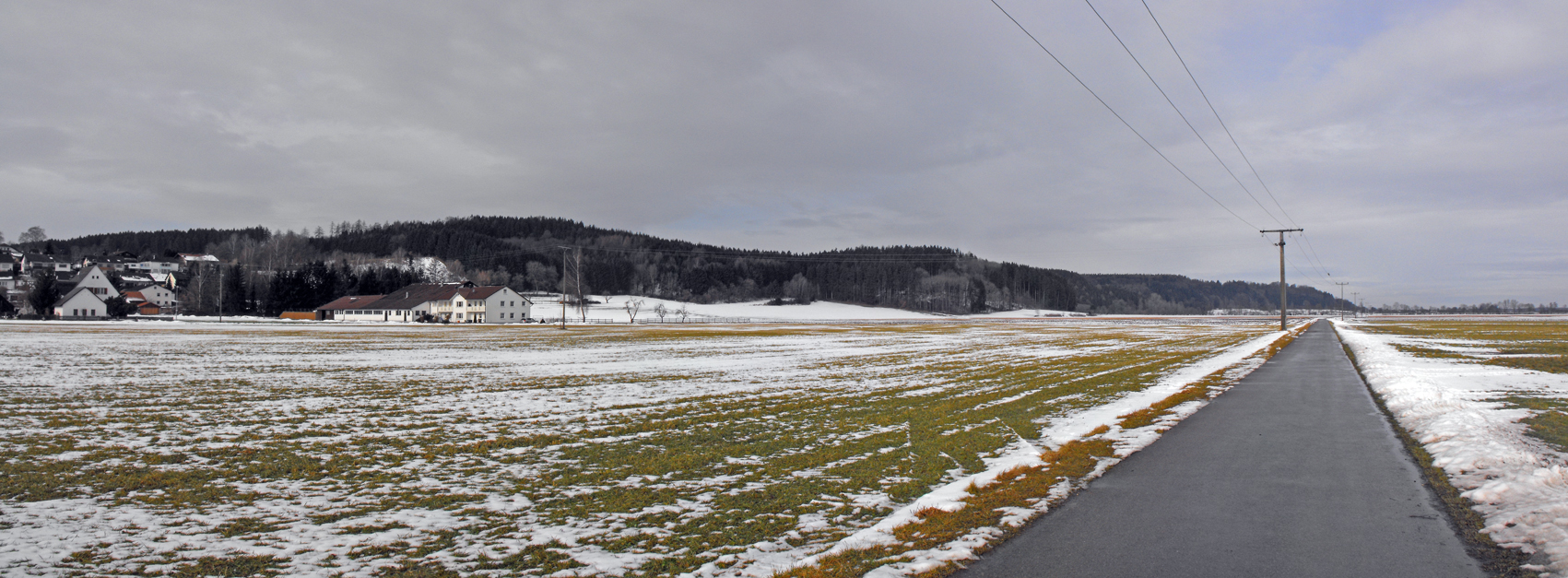
- The Holzstöcke seen from the Iller valley near Kirchberg

Highest point
- Elevation: 700 m (2,300 ft)
- Coordinates: 48°7′51.96″N 10°1′0.48″E

Dimensions
- Area: 381.9 km^{2} (147.5 mi^{2})

Geography
- Location within Baden-Württemberg
- Location: Baden-Württemberg, Germany
- Parent range: Alpine Foreland

The Holzstöcke is an elongated, densely forested, mountain range running from north to south in the German state of Baden-Württemberg. It is up to about 700 m above sea level (NN) and covers and area of 381.9 square kilometres. It is a large, terraced landscape that is part of the Iller-Lech Plateau in the Alpine Foreland of south Germany. It lies southwest of the city of Ulm in the counties of Alb-Donau-Kreis and Biberach in Upper Swabia and rises above the valley floors by about 75 metres.

== Mountains and hills ==
In the southern part of the Holzstöcke near Aitrach the hills gradually rise from heights of around 500 m above NN in the north near Illerkirchberg up to the 700 metre contour line in the south where there is an area of unnamed mountains and hills.

The following is a list of the named high points in the Holzstöcke – sorted by height in metres (m) above Normalnull (NN):

- Runder Kopf (631.3 m), 1.3 km west-northwest of Erolzheim; with transmission tower and water tower
- Roter Berg (629.2 m), 1 km south-southwest of Erolzheim
- Frohberg (Kapellenberg; ca. 629 m), immediately south-southwest of Erolzheim; with Froberg Chapel and water tower
- Gehrn (Gern; 621.7 m), 2 km north-northwest of Berkheim
- Banberg (618.5 m), immediately west of Tannheim-Haldau
- Grafenberg (618.3 m), 2.5 km west-southwest of Kirchberg
- Totenkopf (615.6 m), 1 km east-southeast of Tannheim-Krimmel; with nearby Celtic schanze
- Weiherkopf (600.4 m), 1.3 km north-northwest of Erolzheim
- Schlossberg (568.4 m), 1.2 km southeast of Gutenzell-Hürbel-Niedernzell; with the site of Gutenzell Castle Location: 48.1311°N 10.0168°E
- Weißenberg (550.9 m), between Iller and Weihung near Illerrieden Location: 48.261299°N 10.041543°E

== Gallery ==
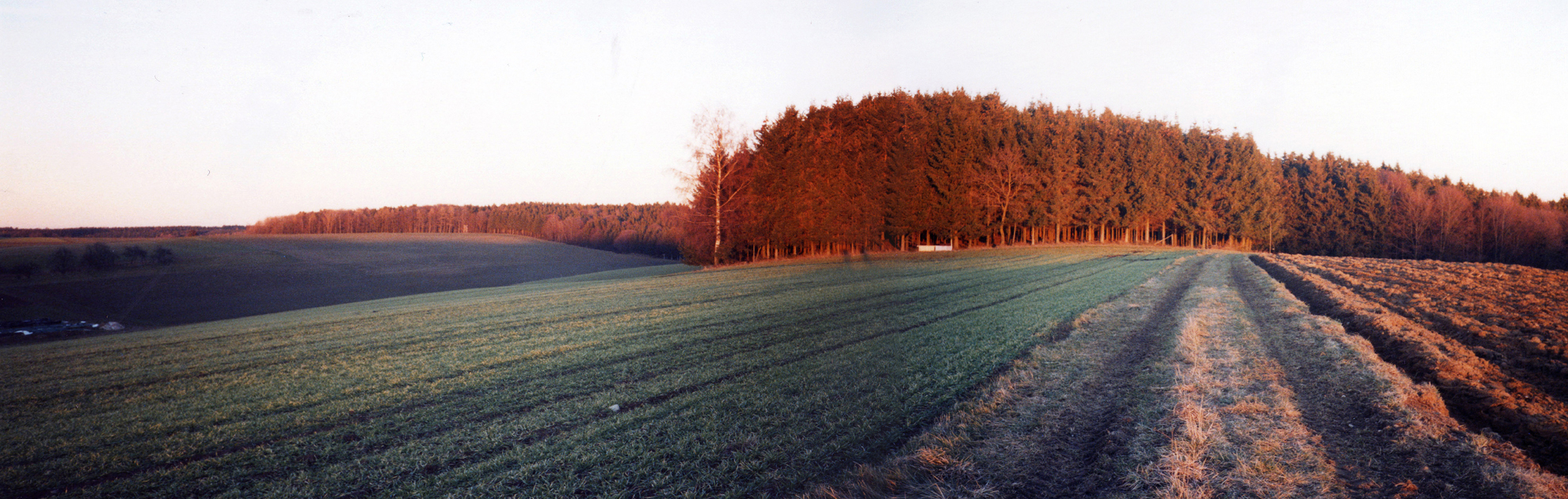
The Holzstöcke near Wain in the county of Biberach

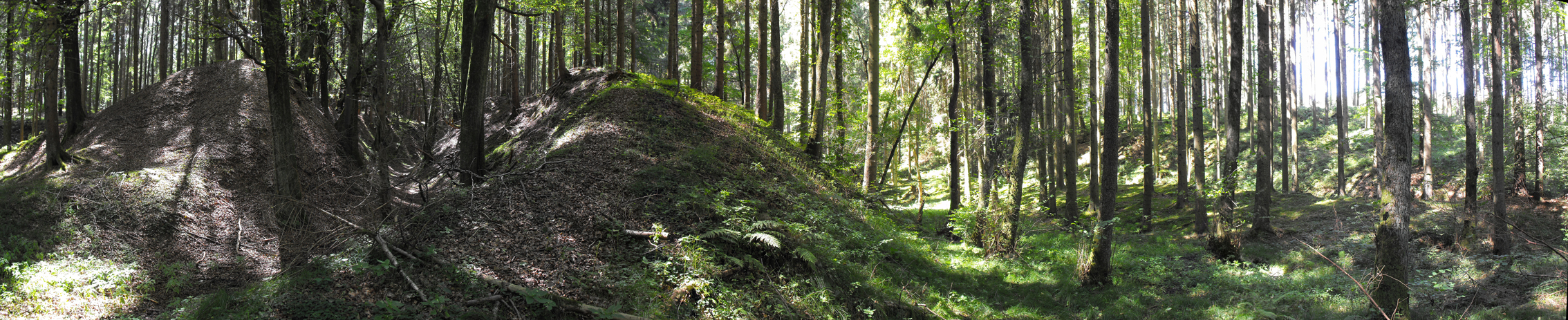
Panoramic view SW of Dietenheim

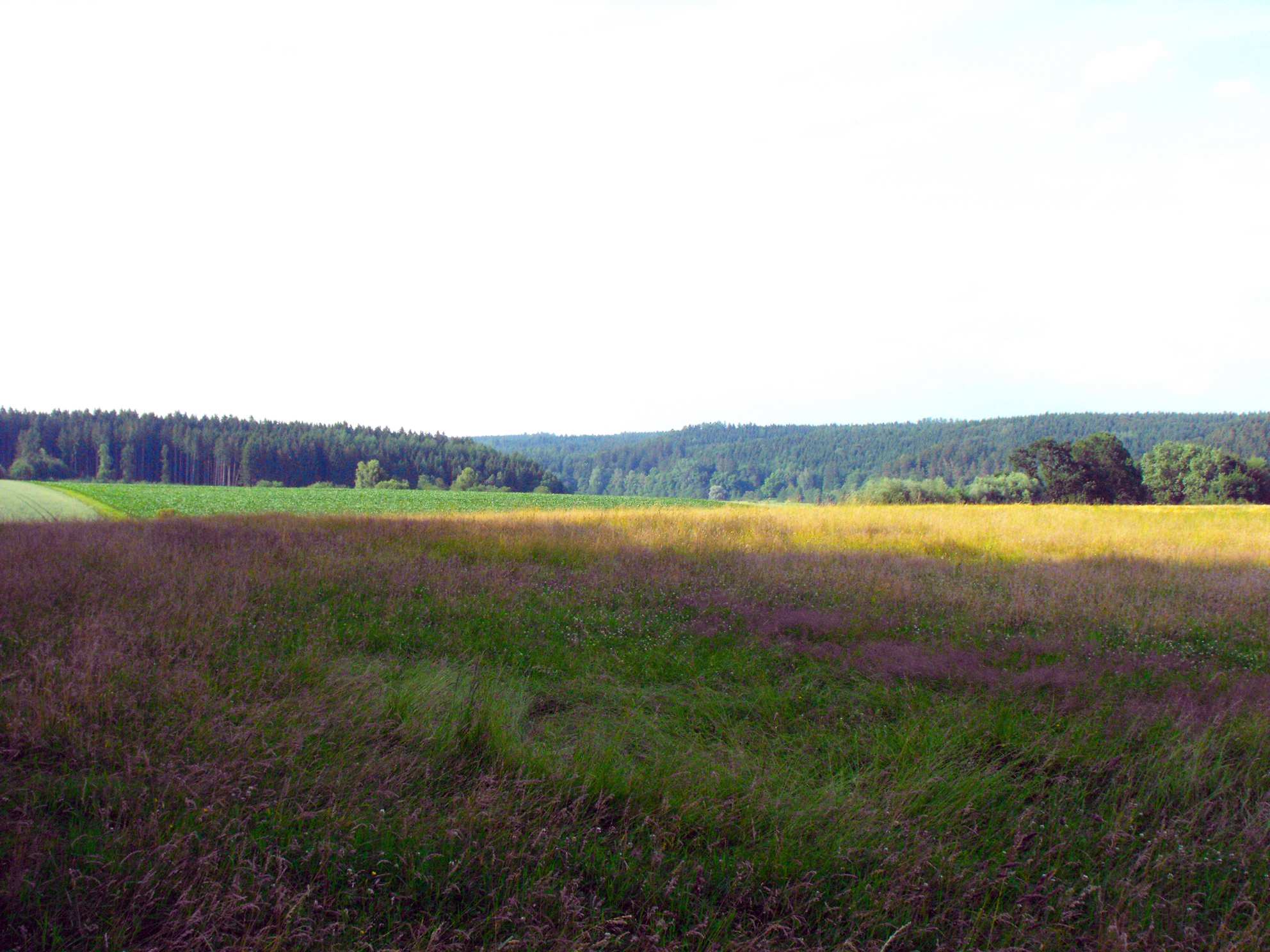
The Holzstöcke in the valley of the Weihung, north of the hamlet of Grubach

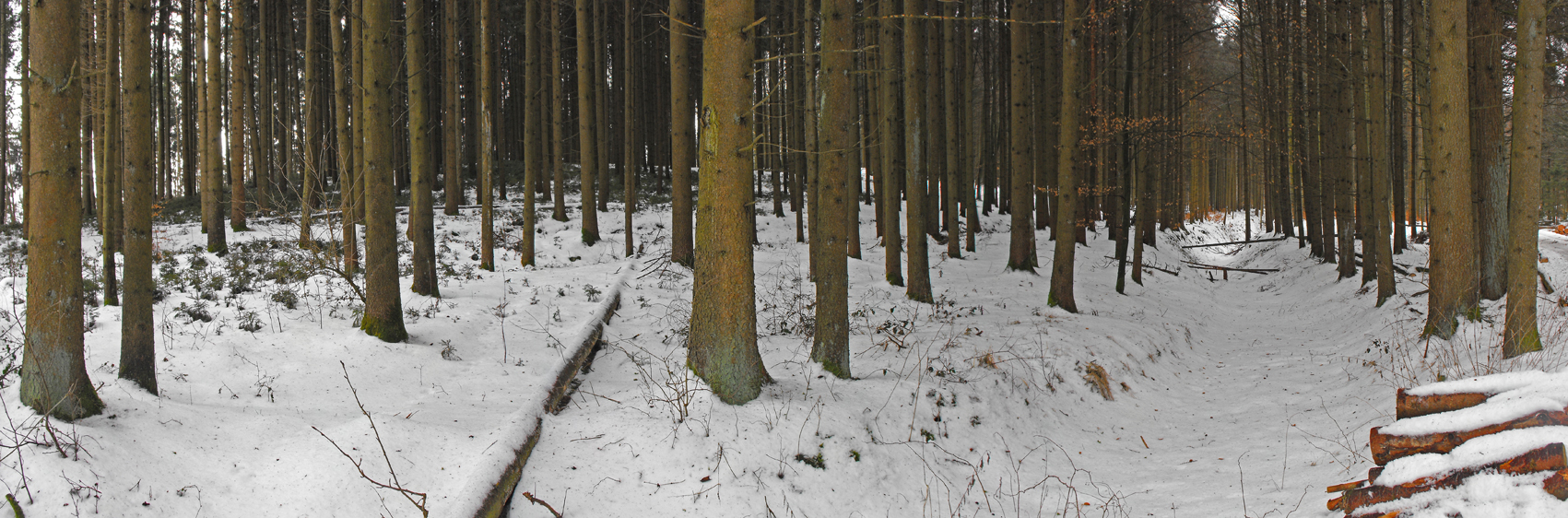
The Holzstöcke, south of Kirchberg on the Iller

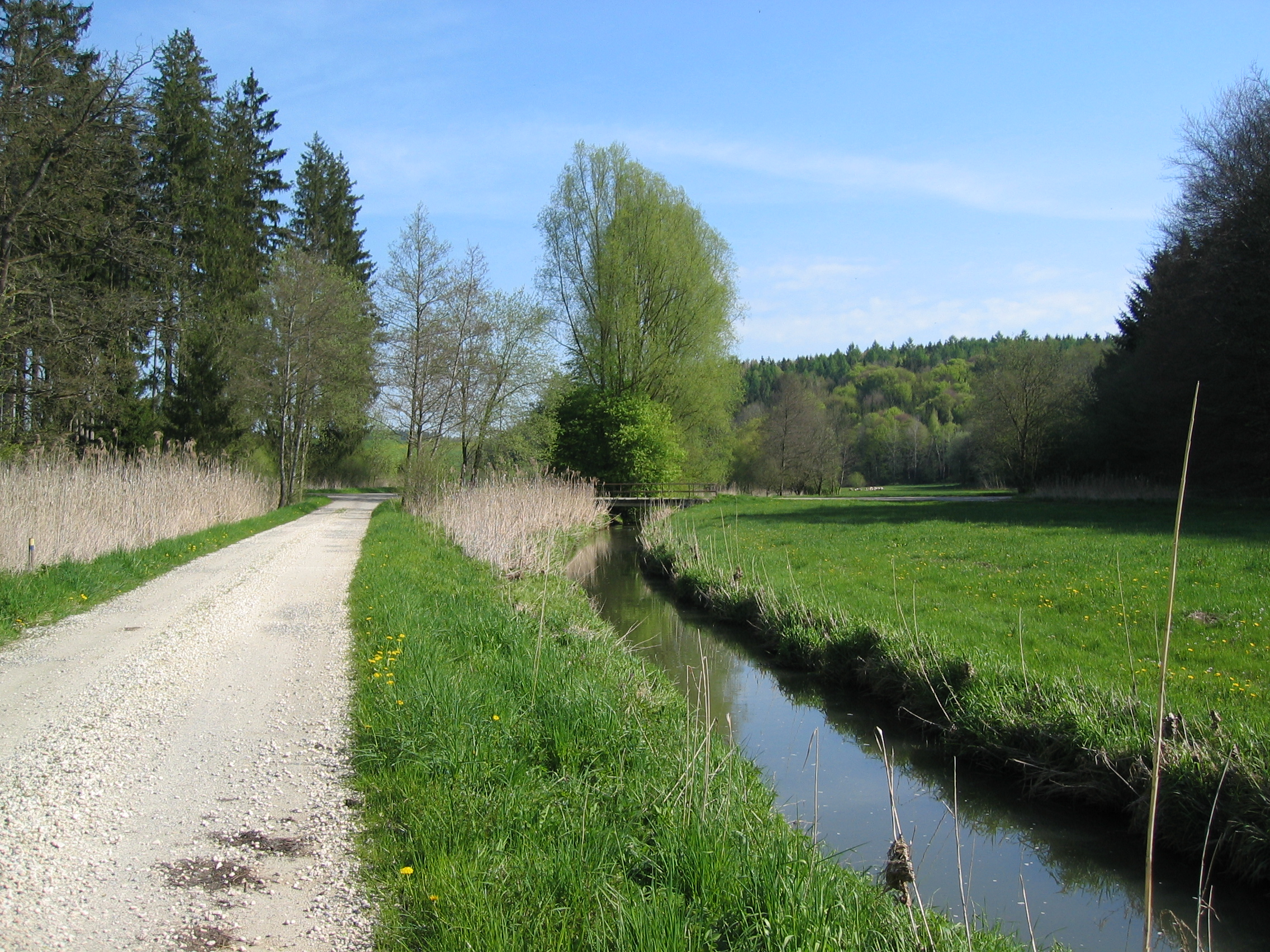
The Weihung is a small river that flows through the Holzstöcke.

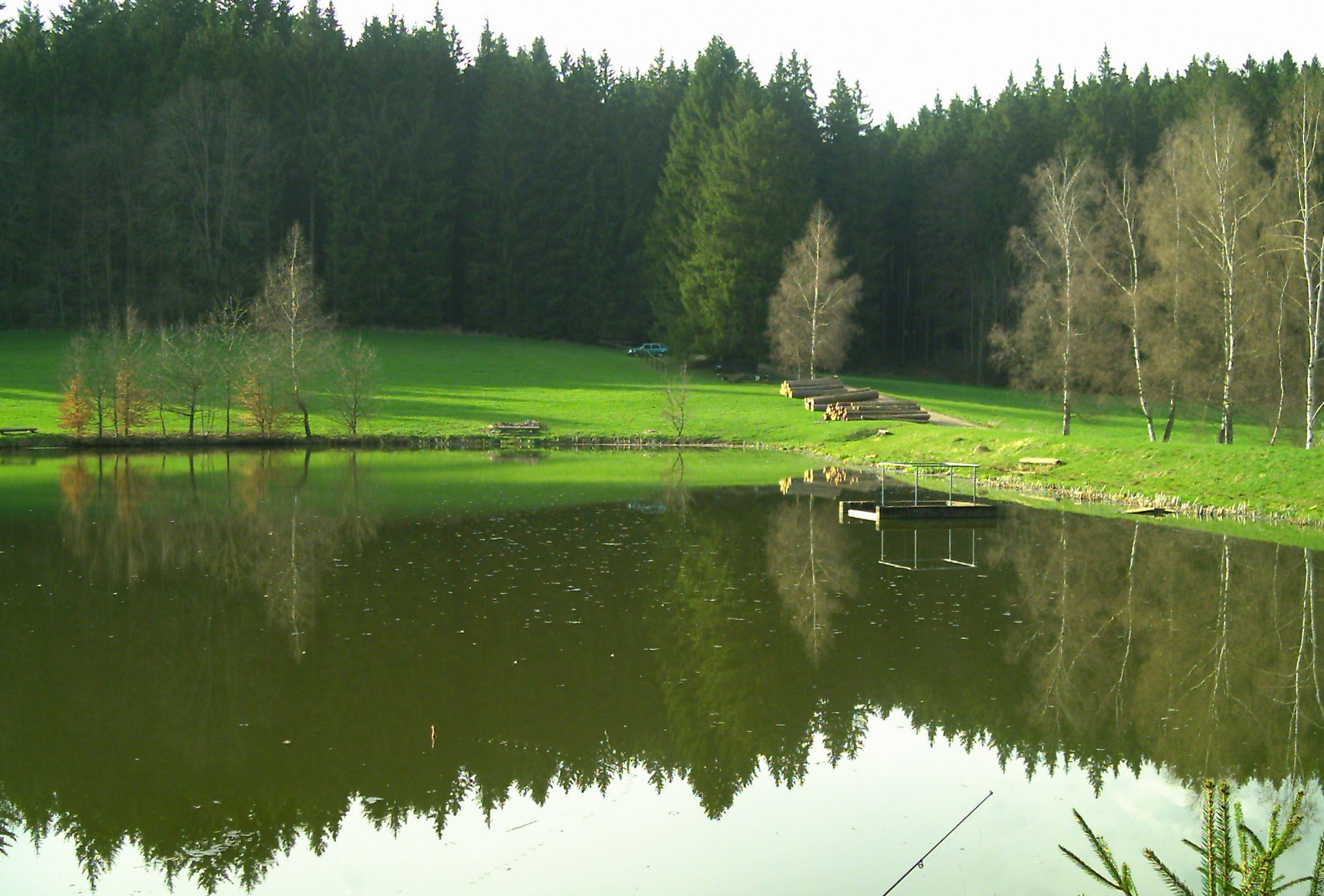
The Tannschorrenweiher on the Haslach Plateaux between Haslach and Tannheim

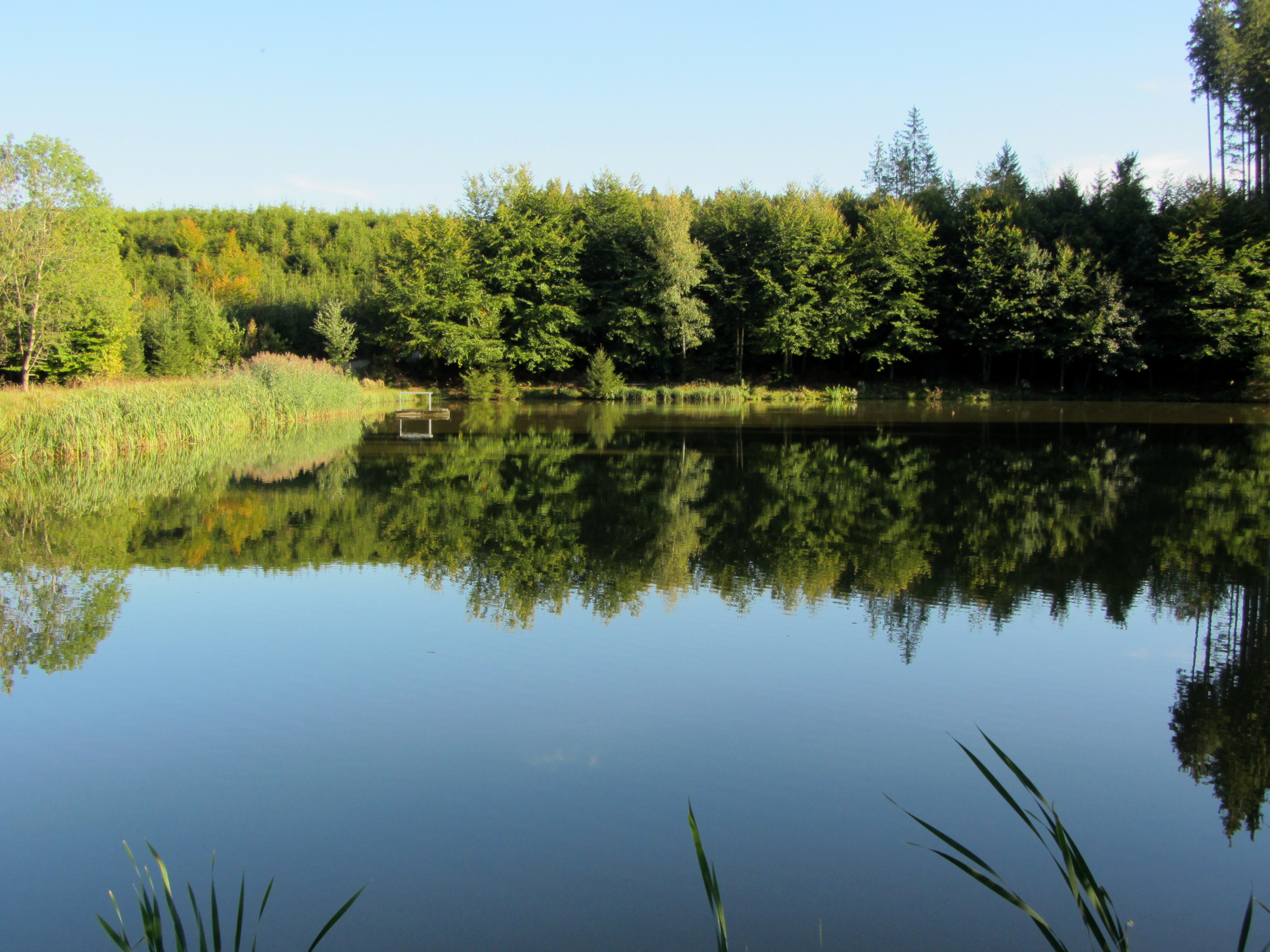
Tannschorrenweiher
