= Liberty Bell (disambiguation) =

The Liberty Bell is an iconic symbol of American independence, located in Philadelphia, Pennsylvania.

Liberty Bell may also refer to:

== Liberty Bell replicas ==
- Liberty Bell (Oregon State Capitol), Salem, Oregon
- Liberty Bell (Portland, Oregon)
- Liberty Bell Museum, Allentown, Pennsylvania
- Justice Bell (Valley Forge), a replica in Pennsylvania representing women's suffrage
- Freedom Bell, Berlin, Germany
- Freedom Bell, American Legion, Washington, D.C.
- State Museum of Pennsylvania, Harrisburg, Pennsylvania

== Music ==
- "The Liberty Bell" (march), an 1893 composition by John Philip Sousa
- "Liberty Bell (It's Time to Ring Again)", a 1917 song composed by Joe Goodwin and Halsey K. Mohr
- The Liberty Bell (band), an American 1960s garage rock band
- Liberty Bell (album) or Fatty Gets a Stylist, an album by Fatty Gets a Stylist, 2011
- "Liberty Bell", a song by The Gathering from How to Measure a Planet?, 1998
- "Hail, Liberty Bell", the anthem of the Free Planets Alliance, a major faction in the Legends Of The Galactic Heroes series of books and its various adaptations

== Other uses ==
- The Liberty Bell (annual), an abolitionist publication from the 1800s
- Liberty Bell (magazine), neo-Nazi magazine
- Liberty Bell (game), a 19th-century slot machine
- Liberty Bell 7, one of the spacecraft of the Mercury spaceflight program
- Liberty Bell Line, a former interurban route in Pennsylvania, U.S.
- Liberty Bell Mountain, a mountain in Washington, U.S.
- Liberty Bell Park Racetrack, a defunct horse racing track in Philadelphia that operated 1963–1986
- Liberty Bell Ruby, largest mined ruby in the world, found in east Africa in the 1950s
- "Liberty Bell of the West", a bell in Kaskaskia, Illinois, U.S.

== See also ==
- Liberty Belle (disambiguation)
