= Vöhringen, Bavaria =

Vöhringen
- Town
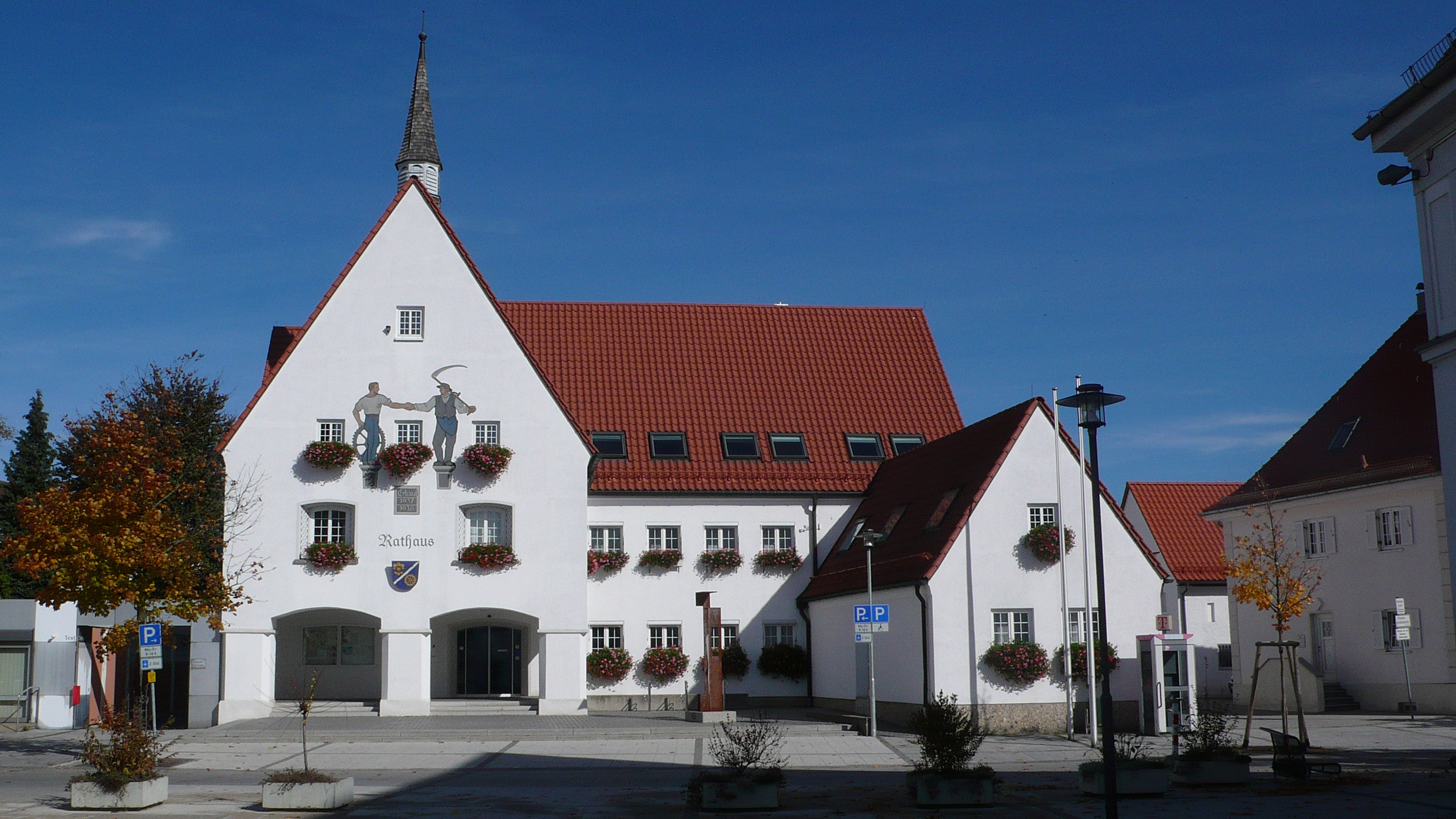
- Town hall

- Coat of arms

- Location of Vöhringen within Neu-Ulm district
- Interactive map of Vöhringen
- Location within Germany Location within Bavaria
- Coordinates: 48°17′N 10°05′E
- Country: Germany
- State: Bavaria
- Admin. region: Schwaben
- District: Neu-Ulm

Government
  - Mayor (2020–26): Michael Neher (CSU)

Area
  - Total: 23.69 km^{2} (9.15 sq mi)
- Elevation: 499 m (1,637 ft)

Population (2025-12-31)
  - Total: 14,060
  - Density: 593.5/km^{2} (1,537/sq mi)
- Time zone: UTC+01:00 (CET)
  - Summer (DST): UTC+02:00 (CEST)
- Postal codes: 89269
- Dialling codes: 07306, 07307 (Illerzell)
- Vehicle registration: NU
- Website: www.voehringen.de

Vöhringen (German pronunciation: [ˈføːʁɪŋən]; Swabian: Vehrenge) is a town in the district of Neu-Ulm in Bavaria, Germany. It is located on the Iller, approximately 18 km south of Ulm and 40 km north of Memmingen. It is in the Donau-Iller Region in Central Swabia (part of Upper Swabia).

== Neighbouring municipalities ==
- Senden to the north
- Weißenhorn to the east
- Bellenberg to the south
- Illerrieden, Baden-Württemberg, to the west

== History ==
The settlement of Vöhringen may have developed by the 5th or 6th century, when the Alamanni migrating from the Danube settled the Swabian river valleys. Veringen, as it is called in several 12th-century documents, underwent several changes of overlordship in the 15th century and finally became Bavarian in 1756 under Elector Max Joseph of Bavaria, earlier than the neighbouring settlements.

Vöhringen was decisively changed by industrialisation beginning in 1864, when factory owner Philipp Jakob Wieland bought the local mill, its attached workshop and the water power to run them. Wieland Group is now known worldwide and an important presence in the town.

Vöhringen became a town on 25 June 1977. At that time it already included the settlements of Illerberg, Illerzell and Thal.

=== Incorporated former settlements ===
==== Illerzell ====
The formerly independent settlement of Illerzell, with more than 1,300 inhabitants, is around 3 km northwest of Vöhringen on the floor of the Iller Valley. It was incorporated into Vöhringen on 1 July 1972.

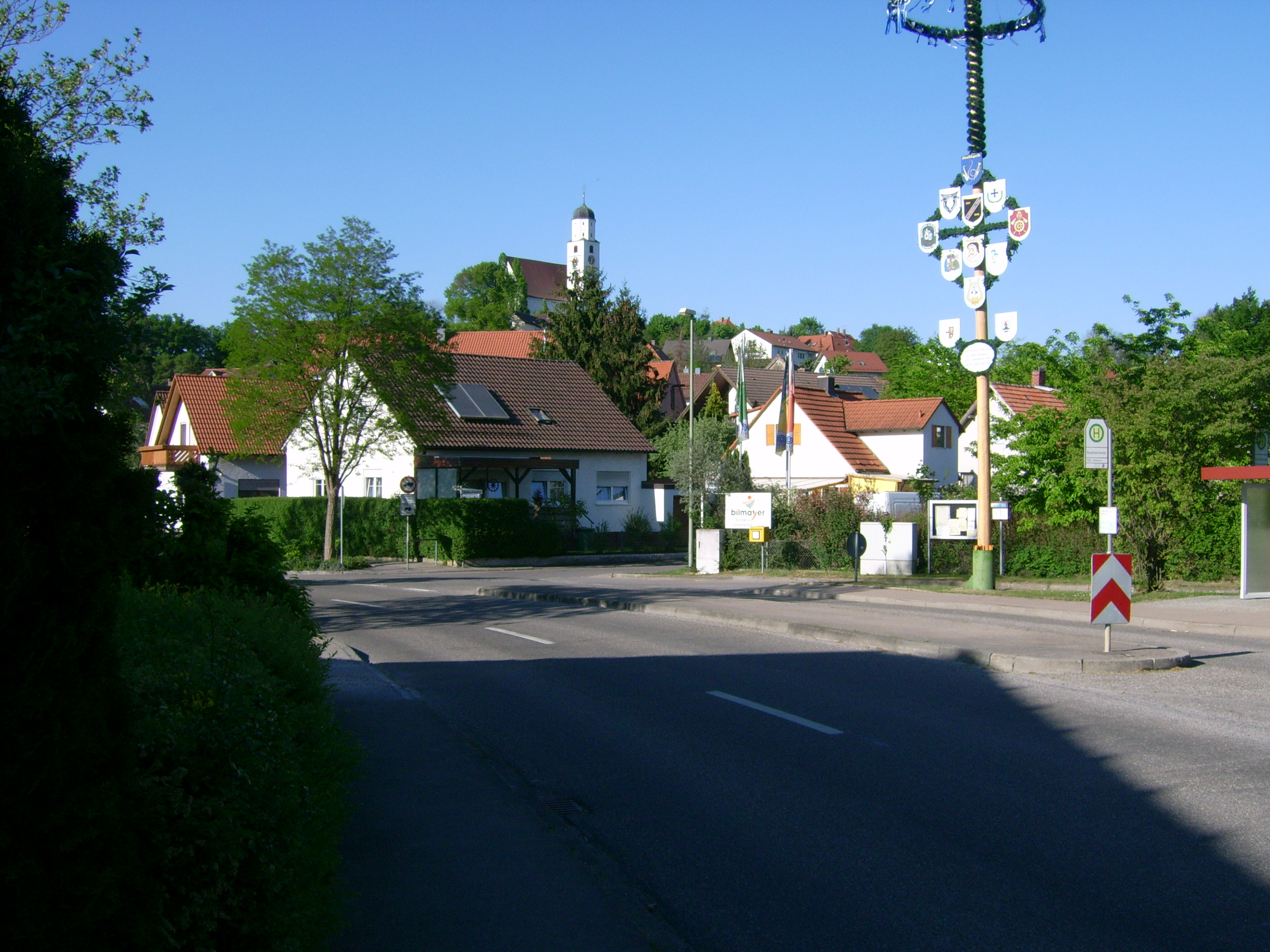
Illerberg with St. Martin's Church

==== Illerberg und Thal ====
Illerberg, with more than 1,700 inhabitants, and Thal, with around 600, are located about 2 km east of Vöhringen and are still largely agricultural villages. In existence since the 6th or 7th centuries, they were long associated under a single overlord and have grown together to form a single settlement; the two were administratively united on 22 November 1970 and were incorporated into Vöhringen on 1 January 1976.

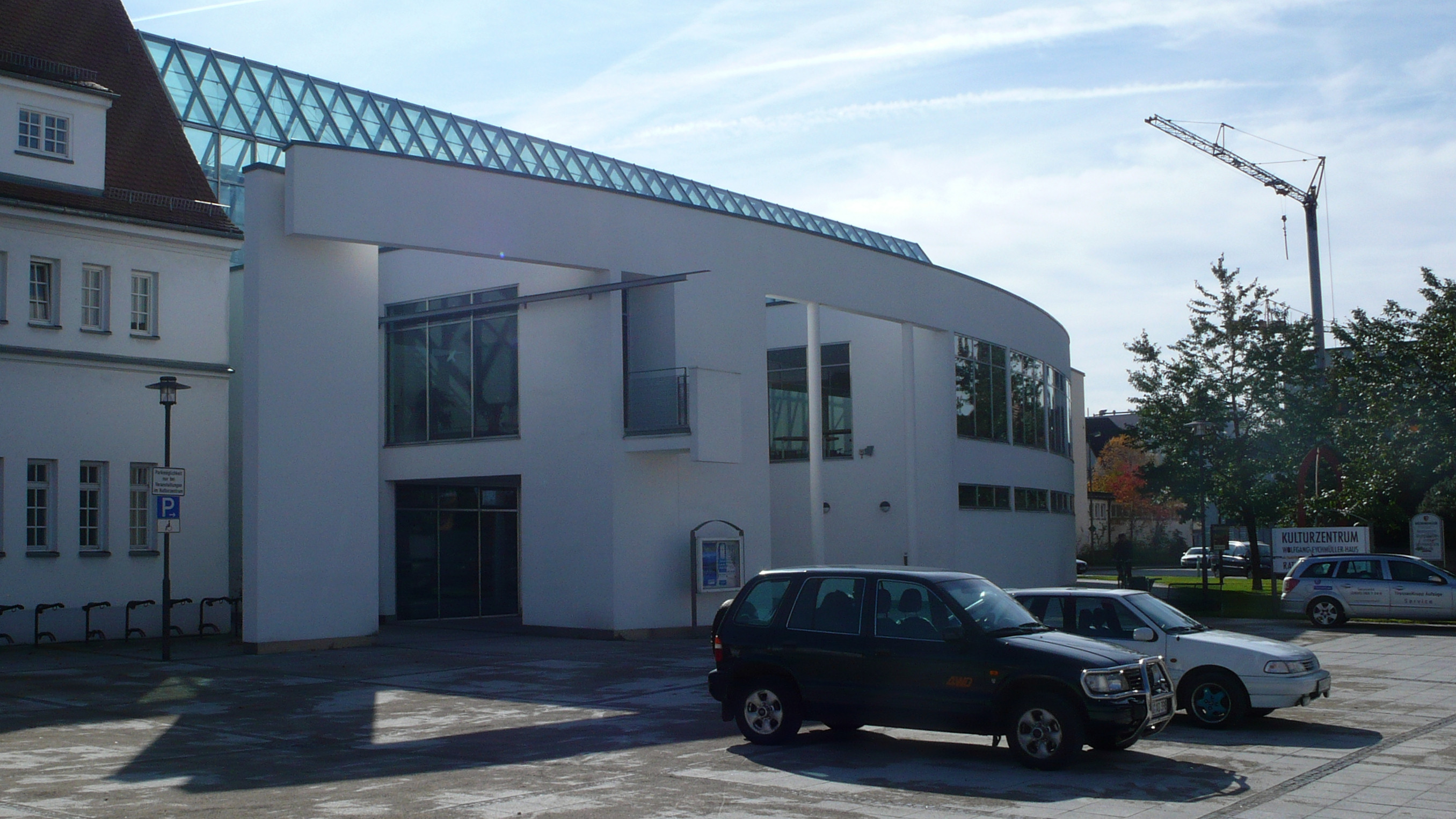
Wolfgang-Eychmüller-Haus

== Culture, associations and noteworthy sights ==
=== Culture centre ===
The Wolfgang-Eychmüller-Haus, opened in 1993 and named for the former chairman of the Board of Wieland Works and honorary citizen of Vöhringen, is the social and cultural centre of the town and the surrounding region. Clubs, associations and artistically and culturally creative people of all kinds make active and frequent use of the spaces which it offers. Its main hall, seating approximately 600, is a venue suited to numerous events including meetings, concerts, theatrical performances and also weddings and other celebrations.

=== Churches ===
The church of St. Martin in Illerberg is one of the most beautiful baroque churches in the area.

=== Sports ===
The largest sport club in Vöhringen is Sportclub Vöhringen 1893 e. V., with approximately 3,000 members and 19 sections.

Sportverein Illerzell 1929 e. V. is the largest sport club in Illerzell, with 550 members.

Spiel- und Sportverein Illerberg/Thal 1948 e. V. includes association football, gymnastics, skiing, tennis and bowling amongst other sports. Its bowling section, Alle Neune Thal (Thal All-Niners), has the largest membership of any bowling club in the region and currently has eight teams in the league.

Schützenverein "Pfeil" e. V. Vöhringen is a firearms club founded in 1906 with about 120 members.

== Economics and infrastructure ==
=== Transport ===
Illerberg has direct access to the A7 Würzburg - Kempten autobahn. A section of the older B 19 between Ulm, Memmingen and Kempten currently serves as a bypass around the town. There is also a railway station on the Ulm - Oberstdorf main line (the Iller Valley Railway).

=== Energy ===
A major power transformer station is located south of Vöhringen. The site also includes a 96-metre directional radio tower.

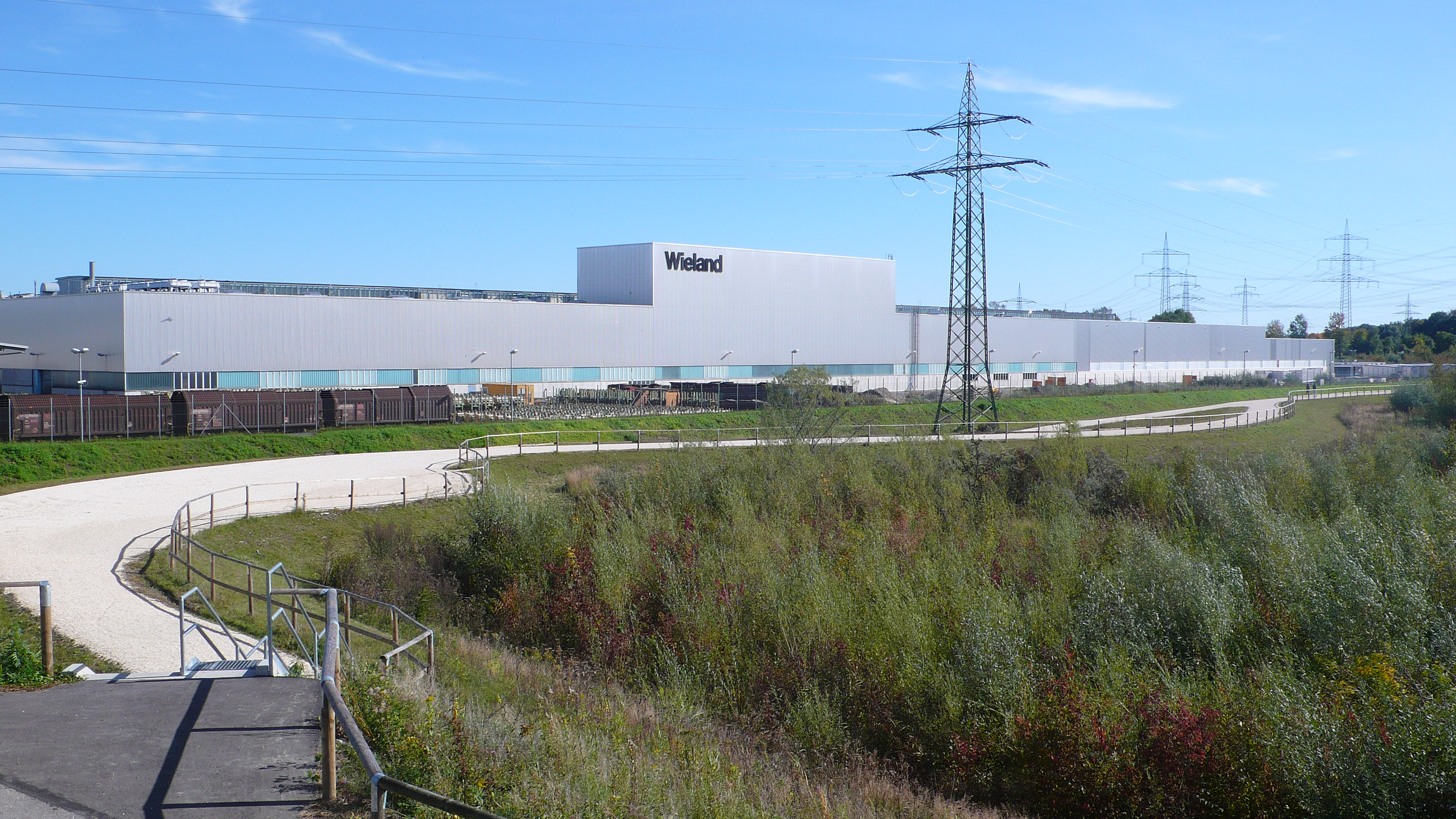
Wieland Works in Vöhringen

=== Companies ===
- Wieland Group
- Schwegler (metalworking)
- Blech & Technik (lead working)
- Hanna Instruments (analytical instruments)

=== Education ===
Vöhringen and its outlying sections together have three primary schools, a Hauptschule, a Realschule, and a gymnasium. In addition, various courses of study at the Volkshochschule are offered and there is a music school.

- Grundschule Illerberg (primary school)
- Grundschule Nord (primary school)
- Grundschule Süd (primary school)
- Uli-Wieland-Volksschule (Hauptschule)
- Staatliche Realschule
- Illertal-Gymnasium

== Partnerships ==
Vöhringen is partnered with:

- (Saxony-Anhalt) Hettstedt, since 1990
- Vizille in Isère, Auvergne-Rhône-Alpes, France, since 2002

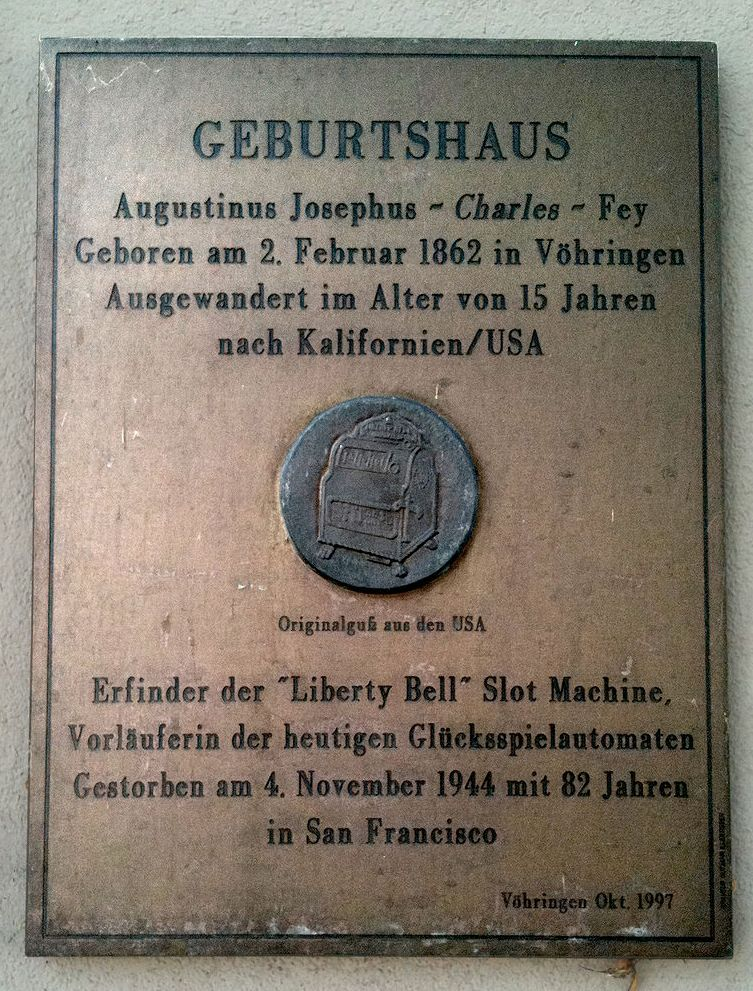
Commemorative plaque marking the birthplace of Charles Fey

== Notable people associated with Vöhringen ==
- Charles Fey, inventor of the one-armed bandit, born Augustinus Josephus Fey in Vöhringen in 1862
- Solanus Hermann, Benedictine monk and missionary to North Korea, a martyr in the Roman Catholic Church, born Rudolf Hermann in Thal in 1909
- Josef Guter, sinologist and author, born in Vöhringen in 1929
- Elmar Stegmann, former table-tennis player on the Germany national team, born in Vöhringen in 1935

== Sources ==
- Reinhard H. Seitz. Vöhringen - Bilder und Miniaturen einer jungen Stadt. Weißenhorn: Konrad, 2002. ISBN 978-3-87437-462-0

== Gallery ==
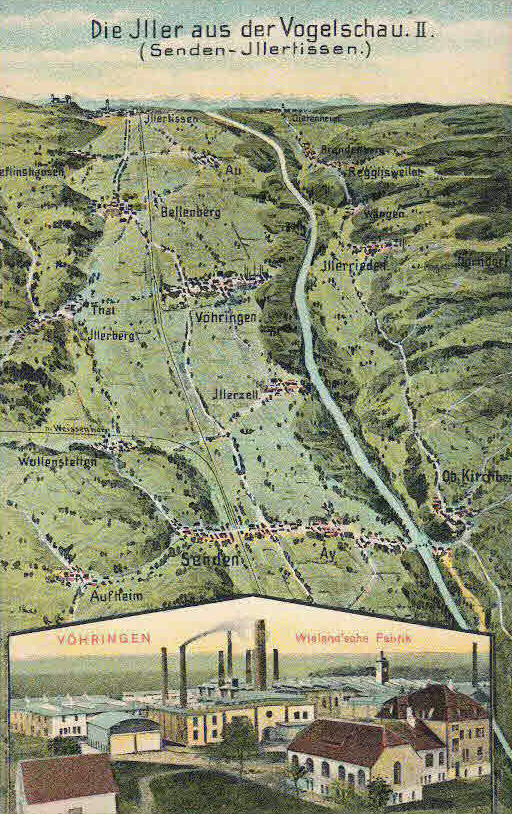
Aerial view of the Iller Valley and view of the Wieland Works: early 20th-century postcard

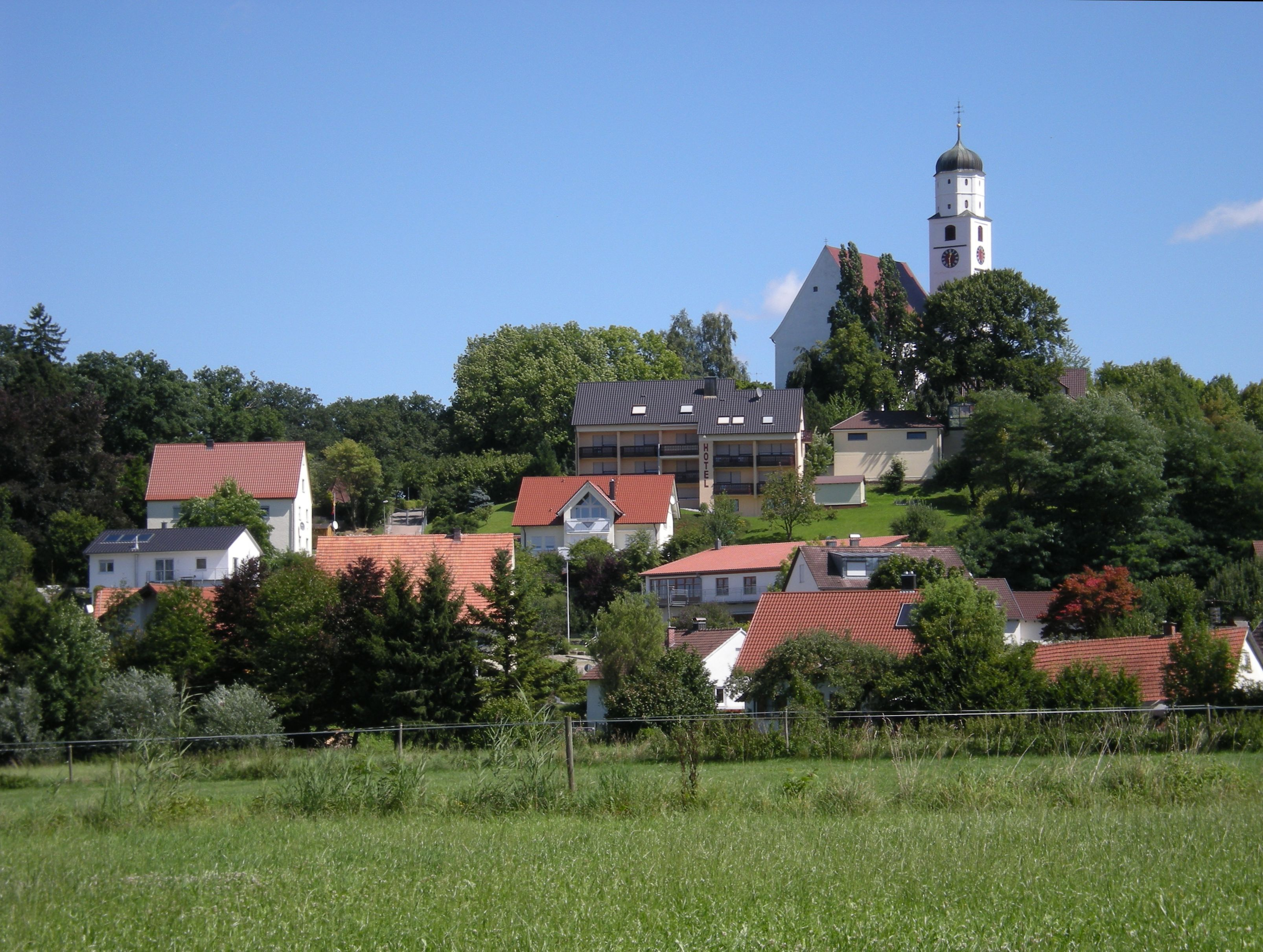
Illerberg
