= Charles Fey =

American mechanic and inventor (1862–1944)

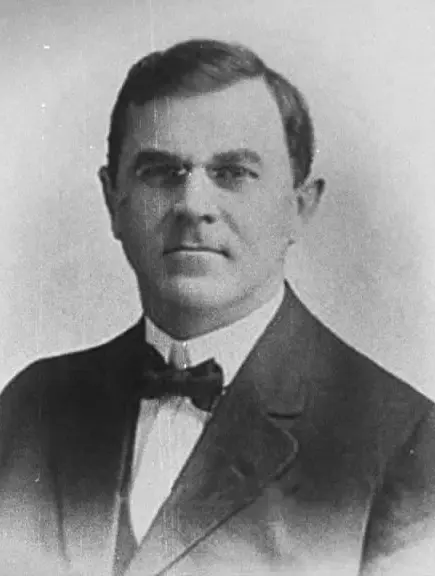
- Born: August Fey; September 9, 1862; Vöhringen, Kingdom of Bavaria
- Died: November 10, 1944 (aged 82); San Francisco, California, US
- Burial place: Cypress Lawn Memorial Park
- Occupation: Mechanic
- Known for: Inventing the slot machine
- Spouse: Marie Volkmar (m. 1889)
- Children: 4

Charles Fey (born August Fey; September 9, 1862 – November 10, 1944) was a German-born American mechanic best known for inventing the slot machine in San Francisco.

== Career and invention ==
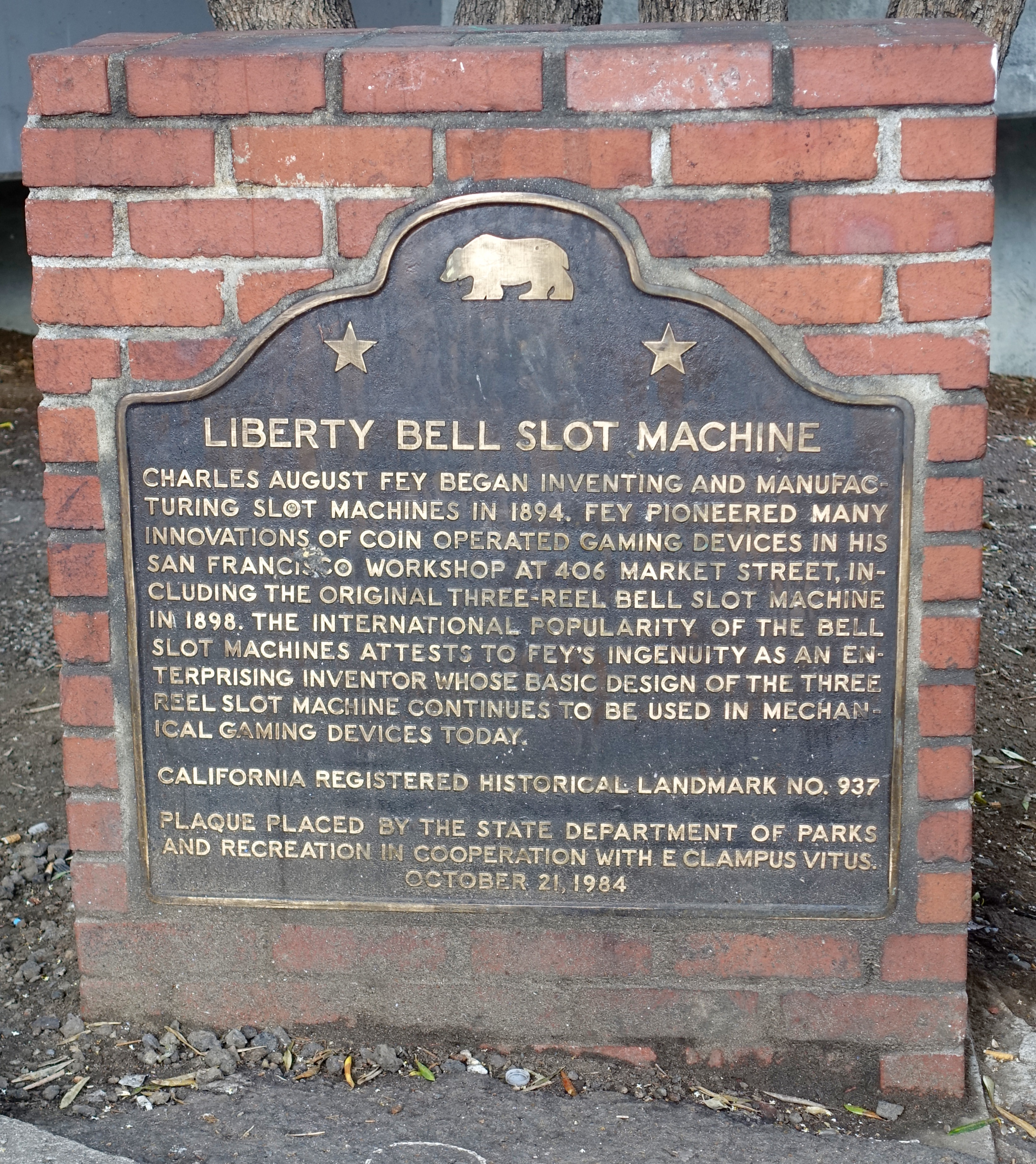
Liberty Bell Slot Machine memorial, San Francisco

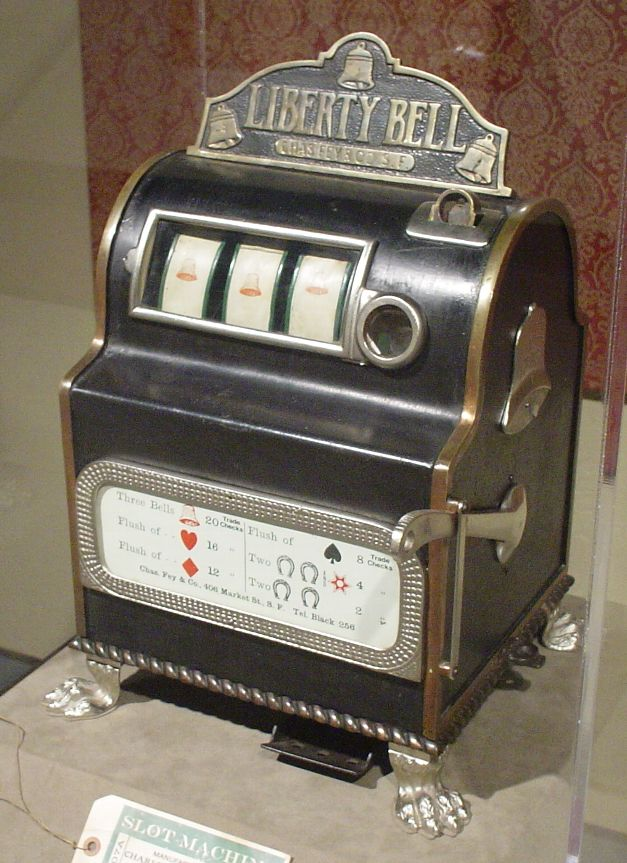
Fey's Liberty Bell slot machine

Fey was born in Vöhringen, Kingdom of Bavaria on September 9, 1862. His father Karl worked as a sexton at the Ulm Minster cathedral and had fifteen children with Charles' mother Maria. As a teenager, Fey worked for a farming tool manufacturer, gaining his first skills, which heavily influenced his career.

In 1877, Charles Fey moved to France to work there, and spent some time in England too, before leaving for the United States at age twenty-three, where his uncle lived in New Jersey.

Fey traveled all over the United States and settled in San Francisco, California where he started working at the Western Electric Works company in 1885. Later he started his own company together with Theodore Holtz and Gustav Friedrich Wilhelm Schultze: this company worked with electrical equipment and telephones.

In the 1880s, slot machines required an attendant to make a payout, usually tickets or tokens. Gustav Friedrich Wilhelm Schultze's "Horseshoe Slot Machine" of 1893 was the first machine to include an automatic payout mechanism. In 1895, Fey invented a modified version of the Horseshoe that paid out coins; this machine became incredibly popular.

Fey opened a slot machine workshop in 1896 or 1897.

In 1898, he designed the "Liberty Bell Slot Machine," the most famous slot machine of its day. When three bells aligned, it paid fifty cents. Fey installed and managed his machines in saloons throughout San Francisco. Because gambling was illegal in California, Fey could not patent his device, leading to many competitors.

== Personal life ==
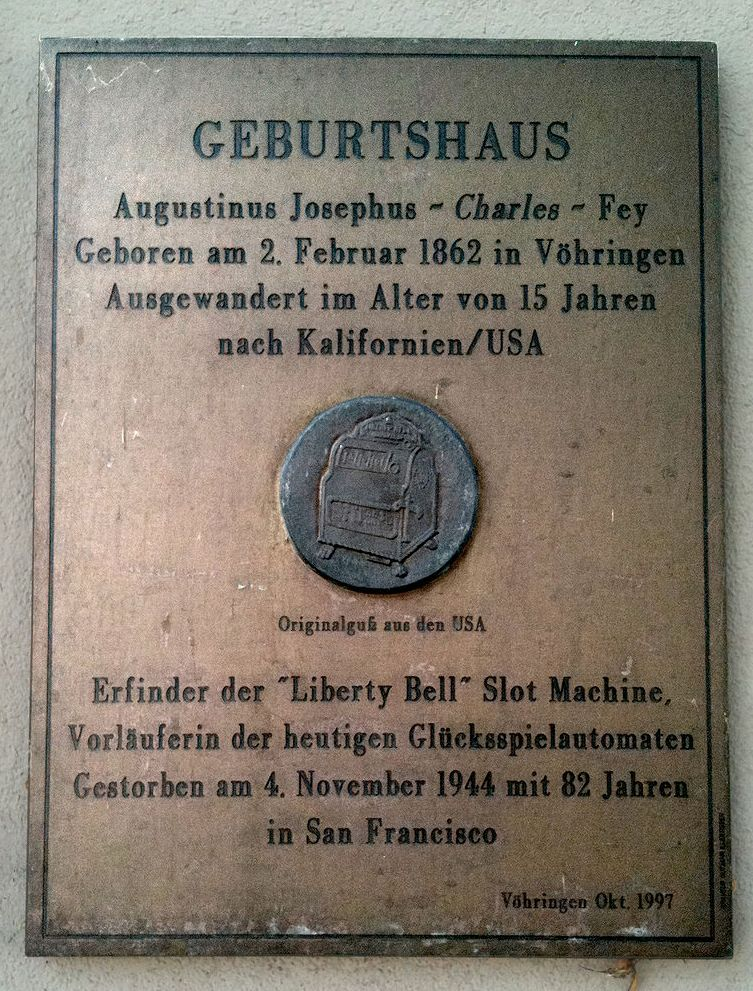
Plaque marking Fey's birthplace in Vöhringen

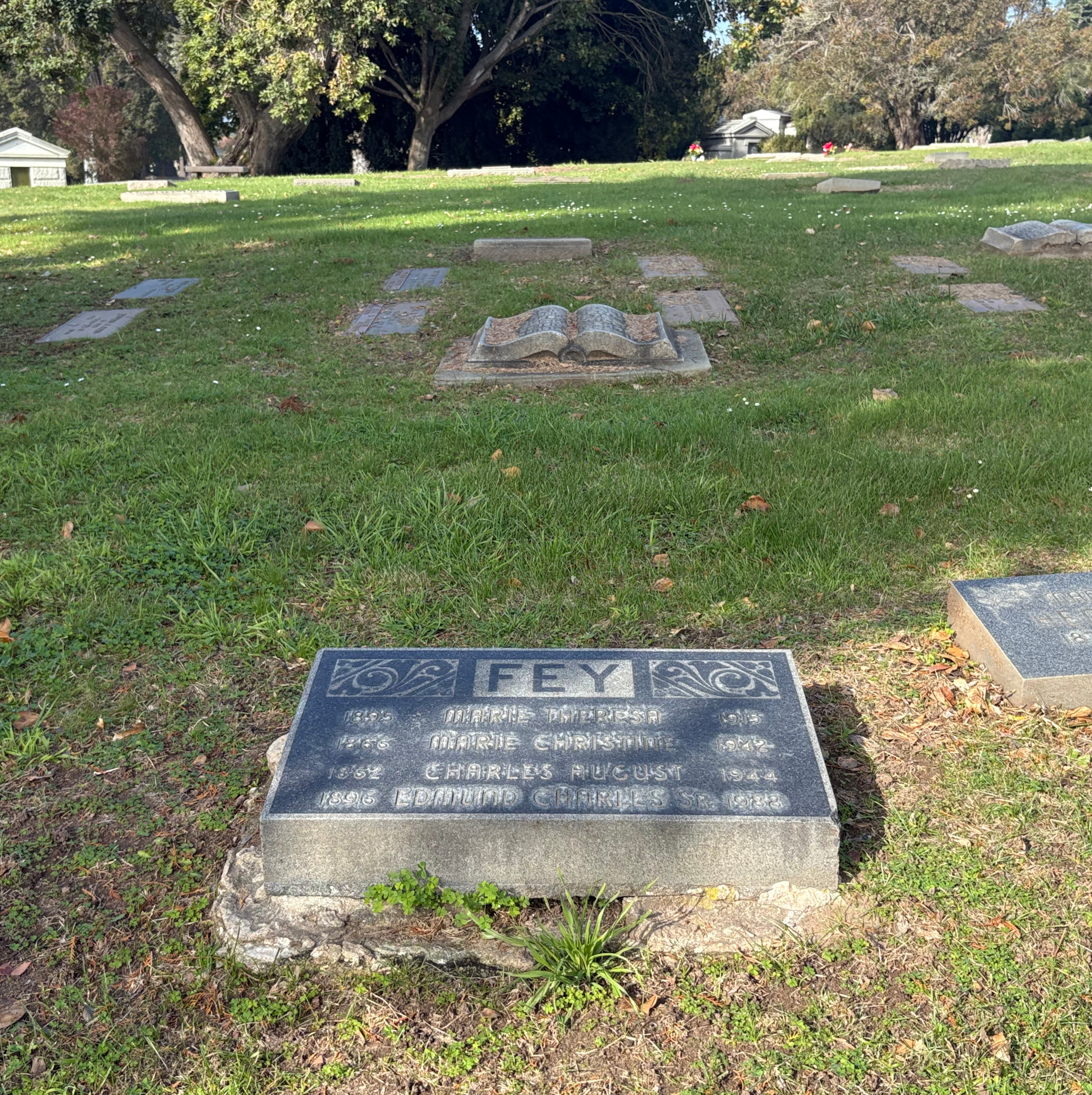
Fey's grave at Cypress Lawn Memorial Park

In San Francisco, Fey met Marie Christine Volkmar, but their courtship was interrupted by illness. In the early 1880s, Fey had been diagnosed with tuberculosis; in accordance with scientific knowledge at the time, he moved to a warmer climate (Mexico) for a few years, before returning to San Francisco for a series of creosote treatments, which were successful. He married Marie in 1889. The couple had three daughters and one son.

During this time, Fey changed his name from August to Charles, supposedly because he did not like the nickname "Gus".

After settling in San Francisco, he remained there except for a brief spell in Mexico, to recover from a bout of tuberculosis in a warmer climate.

Fey died in San Francisco on November 10, 1944, and was buried at Cypress Lawn Memorial Park in Colma.
