= Wieland Group =

Manufacturing company

- Company type: Aktiengesellschaft
- Industry: Copper production metal industry
- Founded: 1820
- Headquarters: Ulm, Germany
- Key people: Erwin Mayr (CEO) Fritz-Jürgen Heckmann (Chairman of the Supervisory Board)
- Revenue: € 6.6 billion (2024/25)
- Number of employees: 10.279 (2024/25)
- Website: http://www.wieland.com

The Wieland Group is a manufacturer of semi-finished products in copper and copper alloys. The group of companies with Wieland-Werke AG as the ultimate parent company is organized into four business units. Since its foundation, the company’s headquarters has been located in Ulm. The Wieland Group has production sites in Asia, Europe and the USA.

== History ==
Philipp Jakob Wieland took over his uncle’s fine art and bell foundry in Ulm’s Rosengasse in 1820 and by 1828 he was producing brass sheet and wire. Around 1900, he also started to produce rods, tubes and sections. In 1865, the company started production at the new Vöhringen plant using hydropower from the River Iller.

In 1919, the OHG (Offene Handelsgesellschaft, open trading company) converted into Wieland-Werke AG. This was followed by the development of new technology and machinery as well as the acquisition of additional plants. In 1945, the Ulm plant was largely destroyed by bombs. At the Vöhringen plant, several production facilities were dismantled. After reconstruction, the company expanded its production capacity in the 1950s and 60s and established a worldwide production and sales organization. Today, the Wieland Group consists of approx. 60 companies (manufacturing plants, slitting centers and trading companies) in 40 countries.

In 1934, Philipp Jakob Wieland set up a factory health insurance, today’s Wieland BKK. He also cared for the families and relatives of his factory workers. He built workers’ houses that still exist on the edge of the Vöhringen plant as well as “hygienic facilities”, i.e. bathhouses with tubs and showers. Around 1900, a day nursery was established in Ulm to counteract the high infant mortality rate. The nursery was under the protectorate of Queen Charlotte, with the wife of the factory owner Max Wieland being a nursery board member.

In July 2019, the Wieland Group merged with Global Brass and Copper Holdings, Inc., a North American manufacturer and distributor of specialized non-ferrous products, which grows the company to over 90 locations with 9,000 employees and a revenue of 5 billion euros.

== Economic Data ==
- Majority shareholder: Schwenk Group, Ulm

	2015/16	2016/17	2017/18	2018/19*	2019/20	2020/21	2021/22	2022/23	2023/24	2024/25
Revenue (million €)	2,547	3,016	3,376	4,500	3,900	5,400	6,700	6,300	5,980	6,619
Number of employees	6,658	6,631	6,680	8,993	approx. 8,000	approx. 8,000	approx. 8,800	approx. 9,400	9,616	10.279

- *On July 1, 2019 the American semi-finished products manufacturer GBC (Global Brass & Copper) was acquired by the Wieland Group.
