= Halsey K. Mohr =

American composer and lyricist

- Occupations: composer and lyricist
- Notable work: "Liberty Bell (It's Time to Ring Again)" "I'm A Yiddish Cowboy"

Halsey K. Mohr (1883 – 1942) was an American composer and lyricist.

== Biography ==
Halsey Mohr was born in Canada in 1883 to a Canadian father and a mother from New York. He moved to the United States when he was age 13. In 1906, he married Helen Quarrels and they had two daughters named Edna and Shirley. He died on August 29, 1942, at age 59.

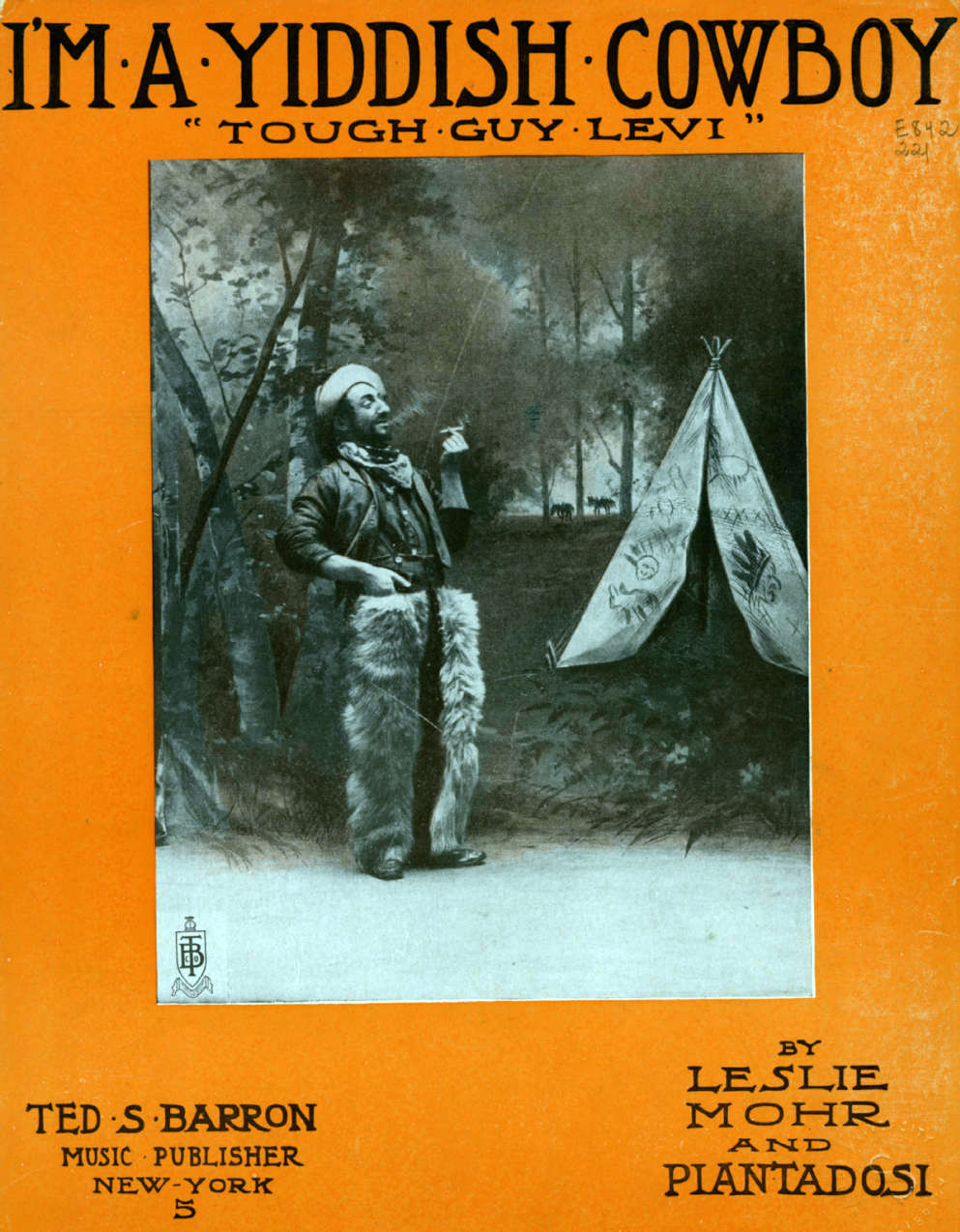
"I'm A Yiddish Cowboy (Tough Guy Levi)" (1908)

== Career ==
Described as a "songwriter and vaudeville song and dance man" Mohr had a successful career as a composer and sometimes lyricist of usually comic songs in the vaudeville and tin pan alley tradition. Some of his more noted songs were "Piney Ridge", "They're Wearing 'Em Higher In Hawaii", "Liberty Belle", "Jane Dear", and "I'm A Yiddish Cowboy". Going against antiwar sentiment during the early years of World War I, he wrote pro-war patriotic music.

== Legacy ==
His daughter Edna Mohr also went on to be a composer.

== Selected works ==
- "My Name Is Morgan (But It Ain't J.P.)"
- "At The End Of The Trail"
- "Piney Ridge"
- "They're Wearing 'Em Higher In Hawaii"
- "Liberty Bell (It's Time to Ring Again)"
- "Jane Dear"
- "I'm A Yiddish Cowboy"

== See also ==
- Edgar Leslie, lyricist who often worked with Halsey K. Mohr
