= Liberty Belle =

Liberty Belle may refer to:

== Entertainment ==
- Liberty Belle (film), a 1983 French film
- "Liberty Belle" (song), a song by Katastrophy Wife
- "Liberty Belle" (Fontaines D.C. song), from their debut album, Dogrel
- Liberty Belle and the Black Diamond Express, a 1986 music album by The Go-Betweens
- Liberty Belle (character), the name of three superheroes; two in DC Comics, one in Charlton Comics
- Liberty Belle (GLOW), character in TV series

== Other ==
- Liberty Belle (aircraft), a former restored B-17 Flying Fortress, destroyed by an engine fire in June 2011
- Liberty Belle, former name of a riverboat in the Gateway Clipper Fleet
- Liberty Belle riverboat, a riverboat at Walt Disney World Resort
- USS Liberty Belle (IX-72), a 1910 experimental ship of the United States Navy during World War II
- Philadelphia Liberty Belles, a football team of the Women's Football Alliance

== See also ==
- Liberty Bell (disambiguation)
