= Michael Joukov =

German politician (born 1981)

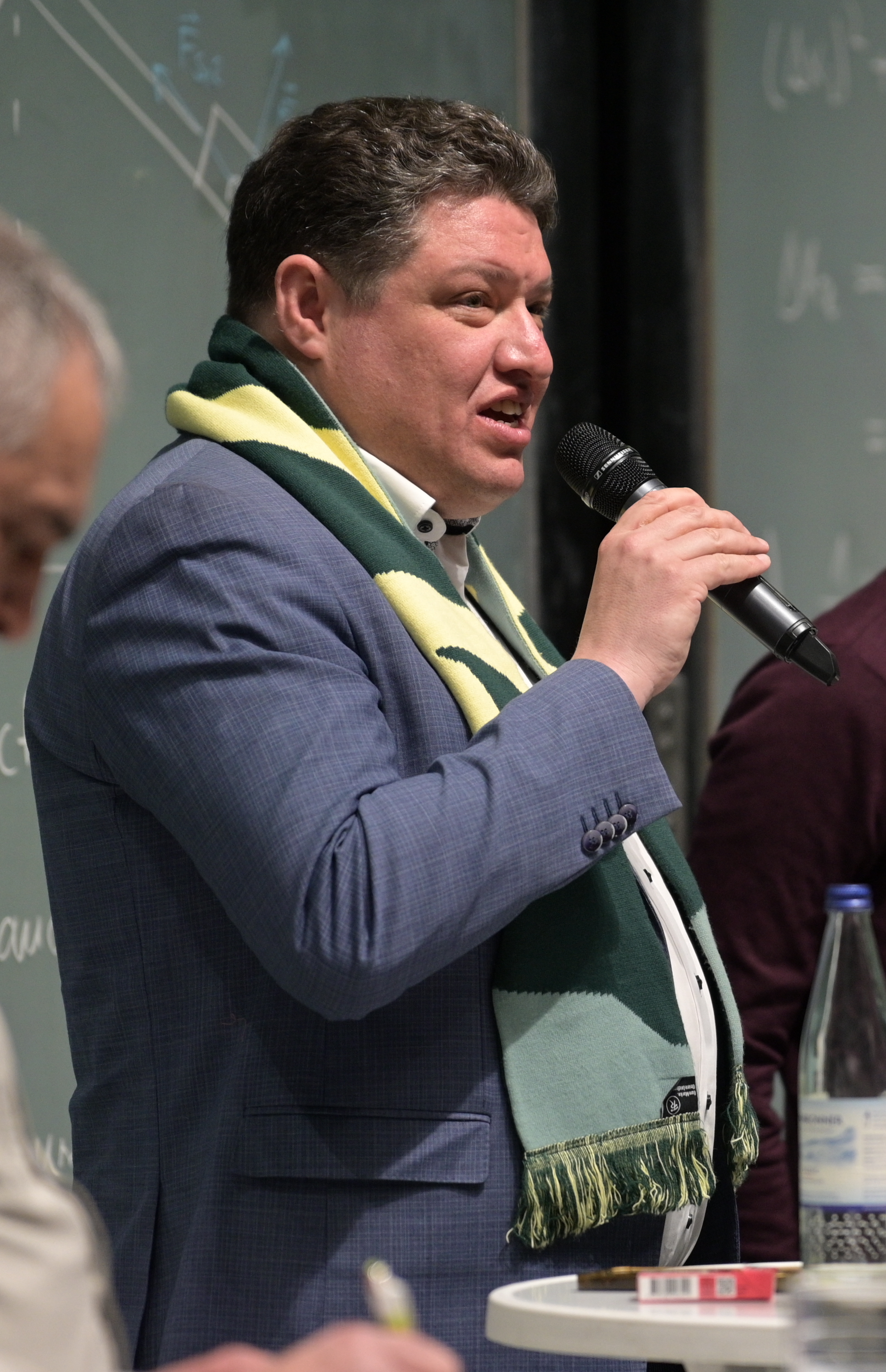
- Joukov in 2026

Member of the Landtag of Baden-Württemberg
- Incumbent
- Assumed office 11 May 2021
- Constituency: Ulm (2021–2026)

Personal details
- Born: 10 November 1981 (age 44)
- Party: Alliance 90/The Greens (since 1999)

Michael Joukov (formerly Joukov-Schwelling, born 10 November 1981) is a Soviet-born German politician serving as a member of the Landtag of Baden-Württemberg since 2021. From 2004 to 2021, he was a city councillor of Ulm.
