= Liberty Bell (It's Time to Ring Again) =

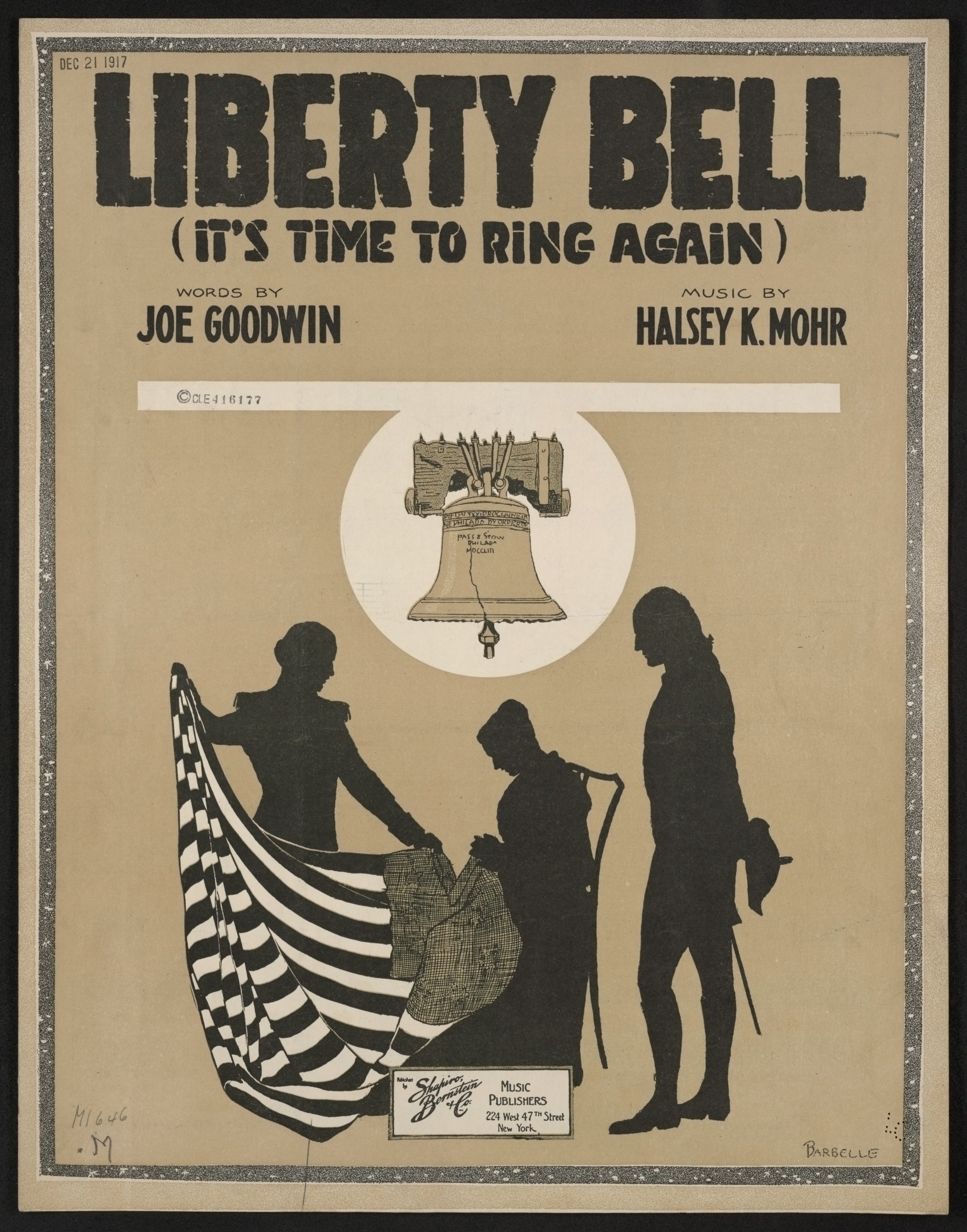
- Sheet music cover

Song
- Published: 1917
- Composer(s): Halsey K. Mohr
- Lyricist(s): Joe Goodwin

The cover has George Washington, Betsy Ross, and her helper.

"Liberty Bell (It's Time to Ring Again)" is a song from 1917 written during World War I. Joe Goodwin wrote the lyrics, and Halsey K. Mohr wrote the music. The song was published by Shapiro, Bernstein & Co. in New York City.

The lyrics to "Liberty Bell (It's Time to Ring Again)" resembles a call to action. The chorus repeats,

Liberty Bell, It's time to ring again...
Your voice is needed now;
Liberty Bell...
Though you're old and there's a crack in you,
Don't forget Old Glory's backin' you

Through the song Goodwin and Mohr were able to point out that the purpose of World War I was to "defeat tyrants who wanted to stifle American freedom, that precious legacy bequeathed by the Revolutionary War." The cover of the sheet music shows a woman, presumably Betsy Ross, mending a flag. A woman is helping her, while a man stands behind her. The Liberty Bell is above their heads. The song was written for voice and piano.

== Recordings and commercial success ==
It was recorded by the Peerless Quartet and Arthur Fields.

The musical score was reprinted four times.

The version sung by Arthur Fields and released by Columbia Records reached the number five spot on the US song charts.
