= Liberty Bell (game) =

1894 slot machine

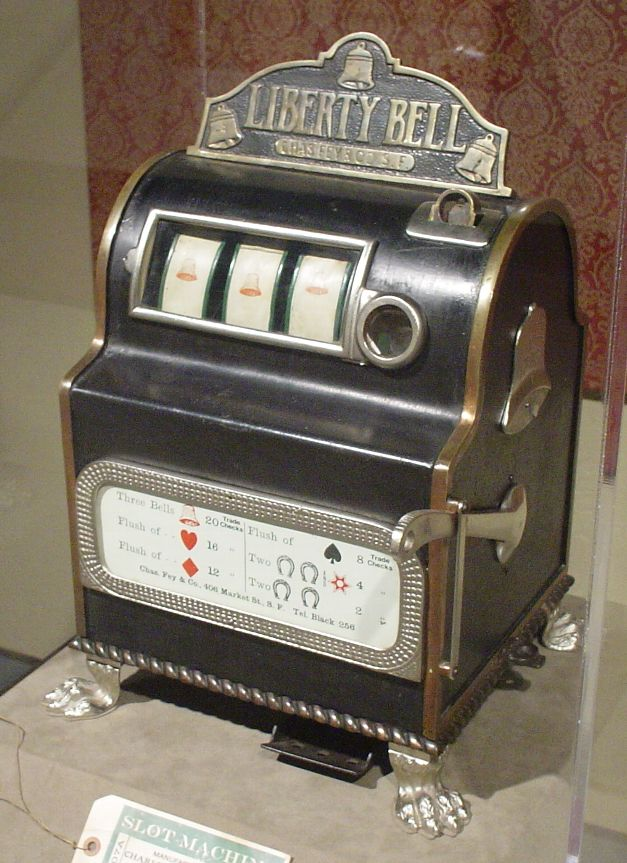
A Liberty Bell machine

The Liberty Bell was the first variation of the modern mechanical slot machine, originally being referred to as a "fruit machine" or "one-armed bandit". Created in 1894 by Charles Fey (1862–1944), a car mechanic from San Francisco, the Liberty Bell's popularity set the standard for the modern slot machine; its three-reel model is still used today despite great advances in slot technology over the past several decades. An original Liberty Bell slot machine is currently on display at the Liberty Belle saloon in Reno, Nevada as a historic artifact.

== How it worked ==
Each of Liberty Bell's three reels were imprinted with a symbol of a diamond, heart, spade, horseshoe, star and a cracked Liberty Bell. Once the player deposited a nickel, he could pull the lever on the side of the machine and the reels would begin to spin, stopping on any random combination of symbols. If the same symbol appeared on all three reels a bell would ring and the player would be awarded with coins. Three Liberty Bells offered the largest payout of fifty cents (10 nickels), which was ejected by the machine.

=== Payouts ===
The payouts for the Liberty Bell were as follows:

- 2 horseshoes = 1 cents
- 2 horseshoe + 1 star = 10 cents
- 3 spades = 5cents
- 3 diamonds = 10 cents
- 3 hearts = 20 cents
- 3 Liberty Bells = 30 cents

== Popularity ==
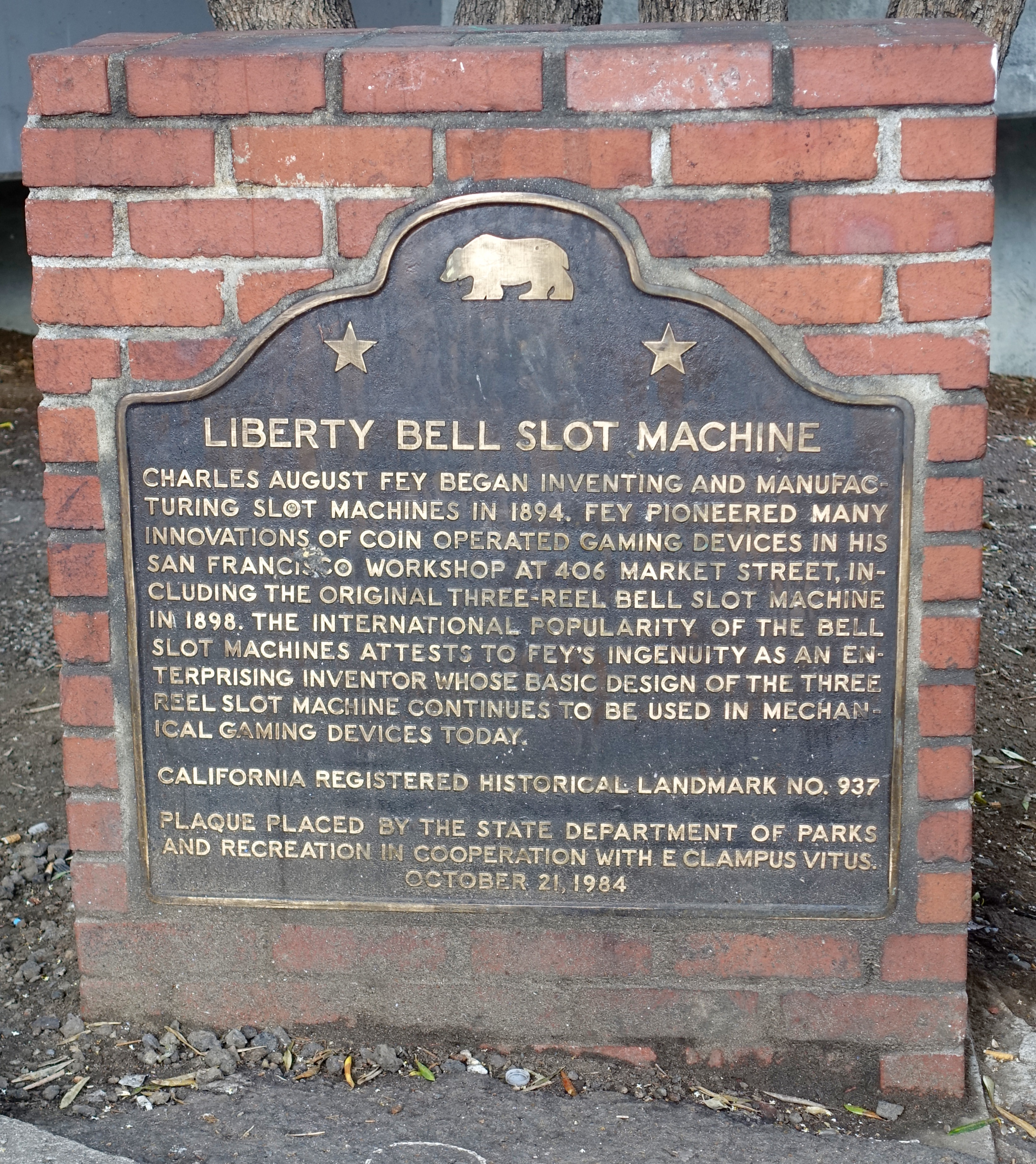
Liberty Bell Slot Machine memorial, San Francisco

In 1907, with the growing popularity and demand for the Liberty Bell, the Mills Novelty Company began manufacturing the "Mills Liberty Bell".

In 1910 the company introduced a slight variation of the Liberty Bell, called the Operator Bell. Changes such as a gooseneck coin acceptor and fruit symbols to replace the traditional images became a standard for slot machines for decades to come, and over 30,000 of these machines were produced. In 1915 the company then began manufacturing a less expensive version of the Operator Bell, replacing the heavy cast iron machines with ones made out of lighter wooden cabinets.

In the early 1930s the Mills Novelty company made additional changes to their line of slot machines. First, they designed it so that their machines were much more quieter, which eventually gave the machines the name "silent bells". Secondly, they created a line of themed wooden cabinets each with its own unique design, the first being Lion Head released in 1931.

It was this time in the 1930s that slot machines saw a rise of popularity in America. In the late 1940s Bugsy Siegel added slot machines to his Flamingo Hotel in Las Vegas, initially as a way to entertain the wives and girlfriends of high rollers. Soon the revenue generated from these machines matched those of the table games.
