= Erbach =

Erbach may refer to:

== Places ==
- Erbach, Hesse, a town in Hesse, Germany
- Erbach, Baden-Württemberg, a town on the Danube River in Baden-Württemberg, Germany
- Erbach, Rheingau, a district of Eltville, Hesse, Germany
- Erbach, Rhineland-Palatinate, a municipality in Rhineland-Palatinate, Germany
- Erbach (Blies), a river of Saarland, Germany, tributary of the Blies
- Erbach, a constituent community of Bad Camberg in Hesse, Germany
- Erbach, a district of Homburg, Saarland, Germany

== People ==
- Christian Erbach (ca. 1568 – 1635), German organist and composer
- House of Erbach, German aristocratic family
