= Weihung =

River in Germany

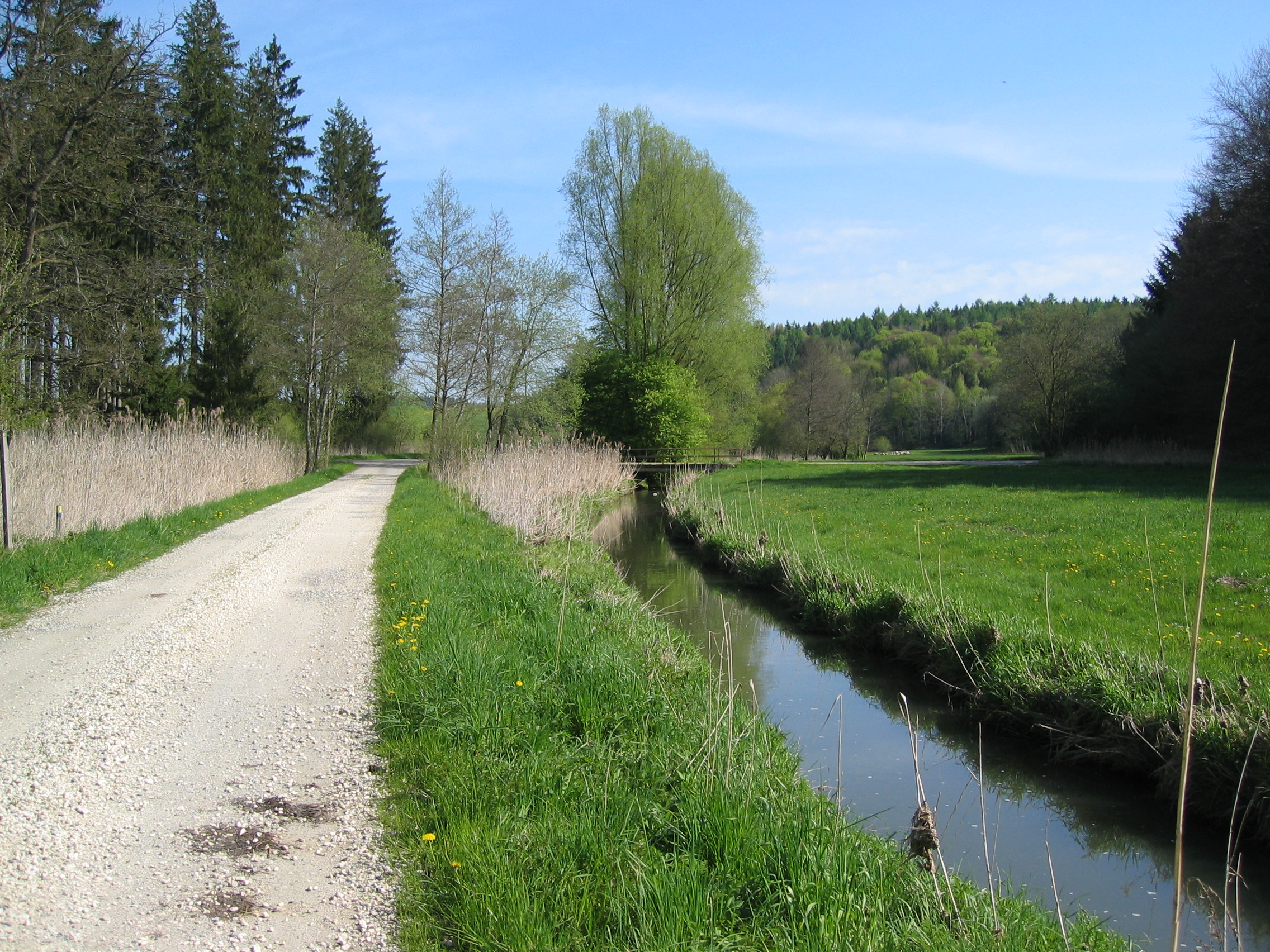

Location
- Country: Germany
- State: Baden-Württemberg

Physical characteristics
- Mouth
  - location: Danube
  - coordinates: 48.3665°N 9.9652°E
- Length: 29.9 km (18.6 mi)

Basin features
- Progression: Danube→ Black Sea

Weihung is a river of Baden-Württemberg, Germany. It passes through Wain and Illerkirchberg, and flows into the Danube near Ulm.

== See also ==
- List of rivers of Baden-Württemberg
