= Schnürpflingen =

- Municipality
- Coat of arms

- Location of Schnürpflingen within Alb-Donau-Kreis district
- Interactive map of Schnürpflingen
- Location within Germany Location within Baden-Württemberg
- Coordinates: 48°16′21″N 9°59′35″E
- Country: Germany
- State: Baden-Württemberg
- Admin. region: Tübingen
- District: Alb-Donau-Kreis

Government
  - Mayor (2018–26): Michael Knoll

Area
  - Total: 10.71 km^{2} (4.14 sq mi)
- Elevation: 537 m (1,762 ft)

Population (2025-12-31)
  - Total: 1,428
  - Density: 133.3/km^{2} (345.3/sq mi)
- Time zone: UTC+01:00 (CET)
  - Summer (DST): UTC+02:00 (CEST)
- Postal codes: 89194
- Dialling codes: 07346
- Vehicle registration: UL
- Website: www.schnuerpflingen.de

Schnürpflingen is a municipality in the district of Alb-Donau in Baden-Württemberg in Germany.

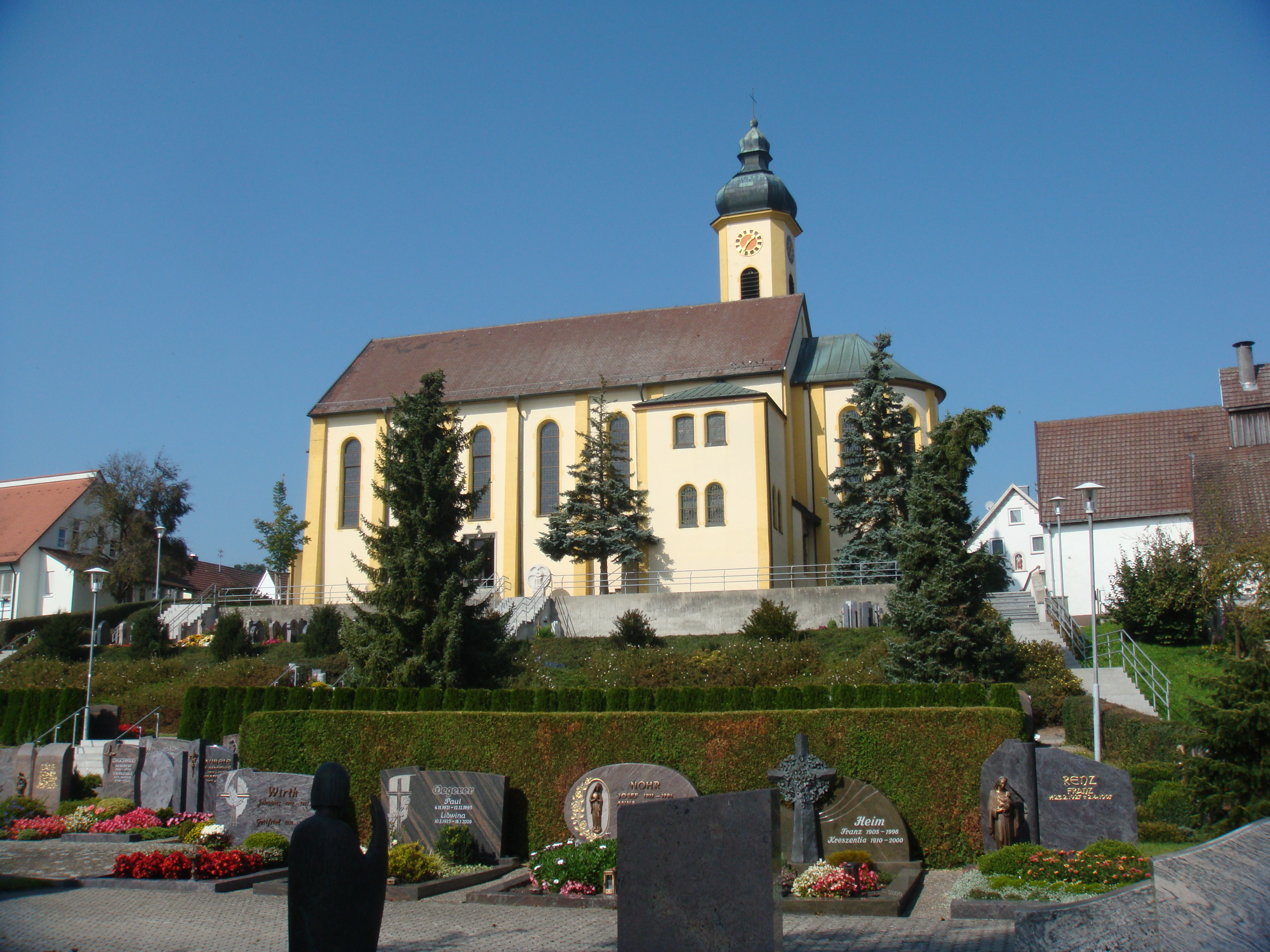
Schürpflingen Church Mariä Unbefleckte Empfängnis (Immaculate Conception)

== Mayors ==
- 1945-1976: Alfred Jans
- 1976-1986: Jürgen Guse
- 1986–2010: Manfred Häberle
- 2010–current: Michael Knoll (independent)
