= Illerkirchberg =

Town in Baden-Württemberg, Germany

- Municipality
- Coat of arms

- Location of Illerkirchberg within Alb-Donau-Kreis district
- Interactive map of Illerkirchberg
- Location within Germany Location within Baden-Württemberg
- Coordinates: 48°19′16″N 10°1′12″E
- Country: Germany
- State: Baden-Württemberg
- Admin. region: Tübingen
- District: Alb-Donau-Kreis

Government
  - Mayor (2020–28): Markus Häußler

Area
  - Total: 11.45 km^{2} (4.42 sq mi)
- Elevation: 480–510 m (1,570–1,670 ft)

Population (2025-12-31)
  - Total: 5,050
  - Density: 441/km^{2} (1,140/sq mi)
- Time zone: UTC+01:00 (CET)
  - Summer (DST): UTC+02:00 (CEST)
- Postal codes: 89171
- Dialling codes: 07346
- Vehicle registration: UL
- Website: www.illerkirchberg.de

Illerkirchberg is a town in the district of Alb-Donau in Baden-Württemberg in Germany.

Unterkirchberg (Lower Kirchberg) had a Roman castrum built around 40 AD as part of the Upper Germanic-Rhaetian Limes to secure the street along the south shore of the Danube.

Oberkirchberg (Upper Kirchberg) was mentioned in 1087 as seat of the counts of Kirchberg who extinguished in 1519. By then, the county had already been sold to Bavaria and then to Austria. It was finally sold by Emperor Maximilian I. to Jakob Fugger in 1507, together with the adjacent lordships Weißenhorn, Wullenstetten and Pfaffenhofen (Roth), for 50.000 guilders. Schmiechen followed in 1508 and the lordship Biberbach in 1514. The emperor granted him the title of Imperial Count in 1514 so the former burgher could operate his business without interference from local nobility. In the course of his life Jakob Fugger also became lord of more than 50 smaller villages. A new castle was built by the Fugger family in 1767; its architect was Franz Anton Bagnato. The castle remained the seat of the Kirchberg branch of the family. Today it is owned by countess Maria-Elisabeth von Thun und Hohenstein, née countess Fugger zu Kirchberg und Weißenhorn.

The county became again part of Bavaria between 1805 and 1810 when it was sold to the Kingdom of Württemberg. Today it is part of Baden-Württemberg, located on the Bavarian border.

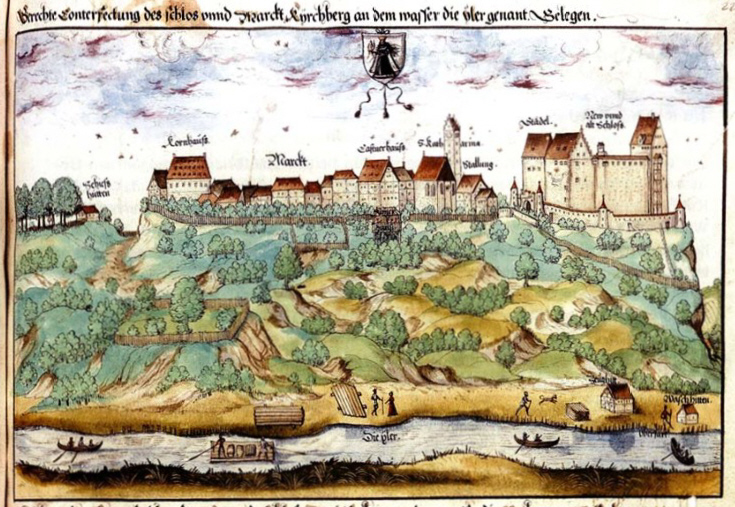
Kirchberg on the Iller in 1555

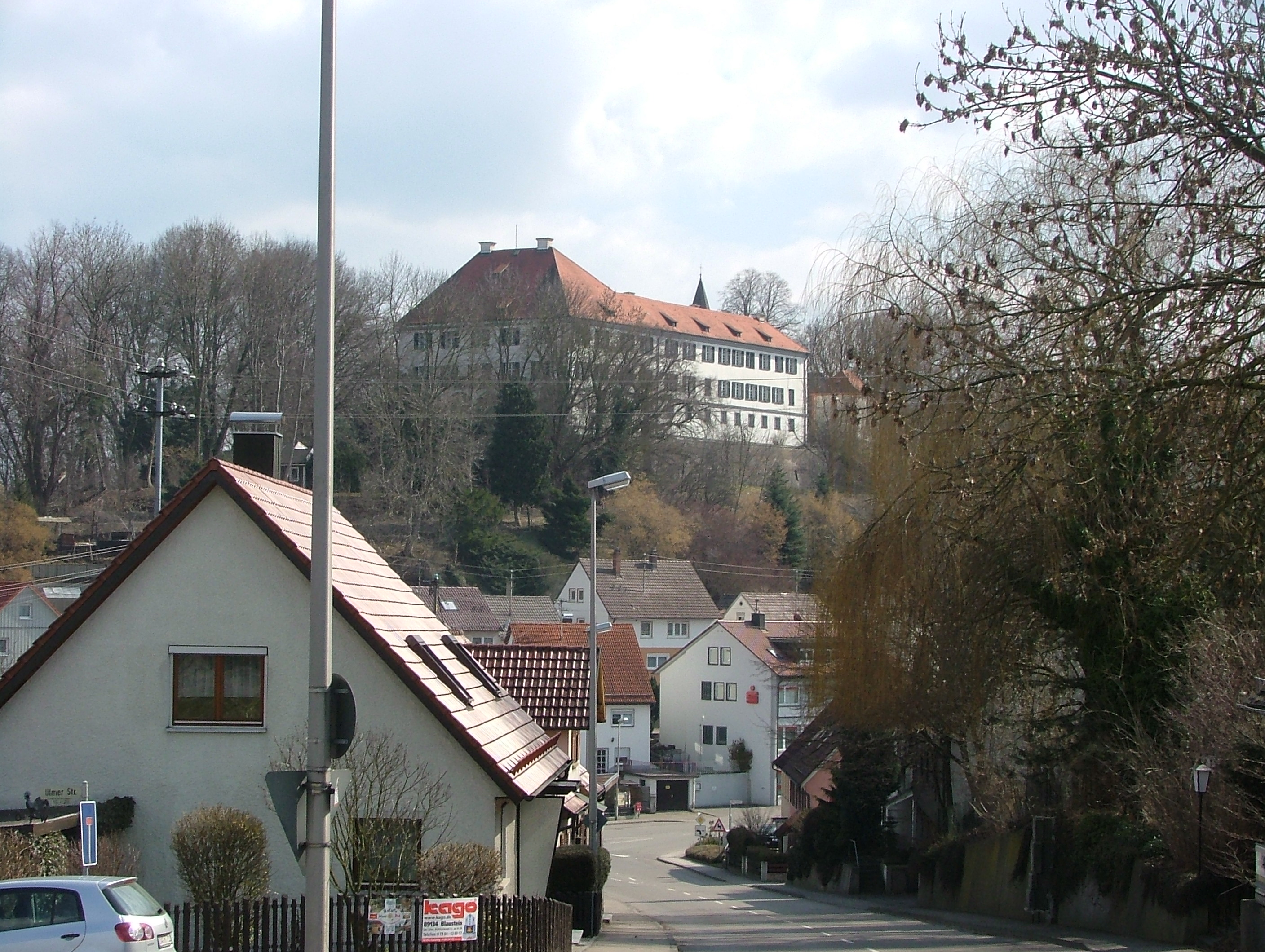
Upper Kirchberg Castle
