= Illerrieden =

- Municipality
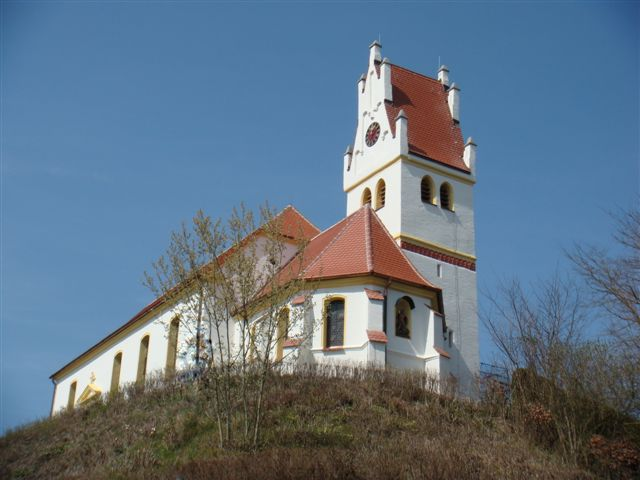
- Church of Saint Agatha

- Coat of arms

- Location of Illerrieden within Alb-Donau-Kreis district
- Interactive map of Illerrieden
- Location within Germany Location within Baden-Württemberg
- Coordinates: 48°16′14″N 10°3′8″E
- Country: Germany
- State: Baden-Württemberg
- Admin. region: Tübingen
- District: Alb-Donau-Kreis

Government
  - Mayor (2020–28): Jens Kaiser (CDU)

Area
  - Total: 18.17 km^{2} (7.02 sq mi)
- Elevation: 492 m (1,614 ft)

Population (2025-12-31)
  - Total: 3,412
  - Density: 187.8/km^{2} (486.4/sq mi)
- Time zone: UTC+01:00 (CET)
  - Summer (DST): UTC+02:00 (CEST)
- Postal codes: 89186
- Dialling codes: 07306
- Vehicle registration: UL
- Website: www.illerrieden.de

Illerrieden is a town in the district of Alb-Donau in Baden-Württemberg in Germany. The city has 3,305 inhabitants and spans 18.17 km squared, with an average density of 181.89 inhabitants per km squared. The city can be reached by the A7 motorway and is an hour away from Munich by car.

Jens Kaiser (CDU) is the current mayor of Illerrieden, re-elected in 2020.

Alb-Donau has a tourism website for information and activities in Illerrieden.

== Mayors ==
Term of Office	Name
1849–1850	Lorenz Hueter
1850–1894	Remigius Vogt
1894–1919	Karl Nothelfer
1919	Joseph Nothelfer
1920–1945	Nikolaus Stocker
1945–1966	Johannes Mock
1966–2004	Franz Geisinger
since 2004	Jens Kaiser
