= Oberholzheim =

- Ortsteil of Achstetten
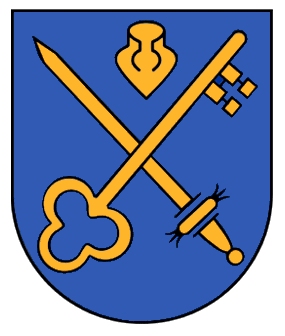
- Coat of arms
- Interactive map of Oberholzheim
- Location within Germany Location within Baden-Württemberg
- Coordinates: 48°15′34″N 9°55′32″E
- Country: Germany
- State: Baden-Württemberg
- Admin. region: Tübingen
- District: Biberach
- Municipality: Achstetten
- Elevation: 537 m (1,762 ft)

Population (2019-12-31)
  - Total: 857
- Time zone: UTC+01:00 (CET)
  - Summer (DST): UTC+02:00 (CEST)
- Postal codes: 88480
- Dialling codes: 07392

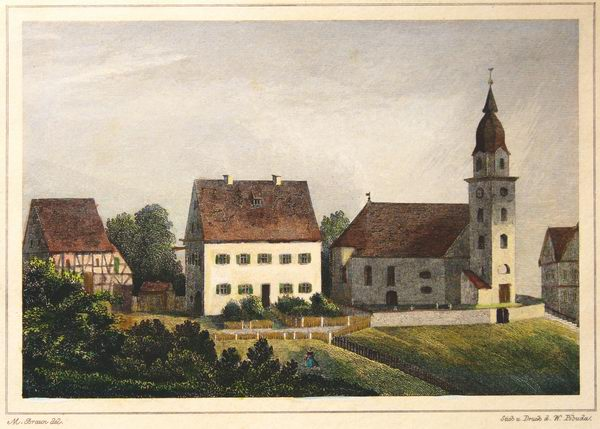
Parish church St Peter and Paul with birthplace of Christoph Martin Wieland to the left

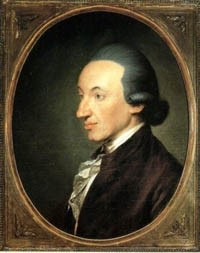
Christoph Martin Wieland

Oberholzheim is a village in the state of Baden-Württemberg, Germany, with a population of 857. Administratively, it is part of the municipality of Achstetten and has a population of 858.

== Geography ==
Oberholzheim is located 1 km east of Achstetten and 1 km west of Bihlafingen on the country road 261. To the north-east it borders on the municipality of Hüttisheim, part of Alb-Donau district. The village is situated on a high plateau between the valleys of the rivers Rot and Schmiehe.

== History ==
The area of Oberholzheim has been inhabited since ancient times. A Celtic grave, believed to be dating to the second millennium BCE, and containing a Bronze Age axe, was discovered on its territory.

Oberholzheim is first mentioned as Holtzheim in documents of 926 where Weissenburg Abbey is referred to as owing several farms and rights in the village. In 1275 the local church seems to have been independent from local aristocratic patronage. However, by the mid-14th century the lords of Freyberg had acquired the jus patronatus over the church. In the early 15th century the village came into the possession of several Ulm citizens and Gutenzell Abbey. The abbey also had the right to exercise low justice. The parts belonging to the Ulm citizens were sold to Spital, a charitable institution for all citizens founded in 1239, from the Free imperial city Biberach an der Riss in 1439. The rights to carry out high justice was first executed by the counts of Kirchberg but passed on to the Biberach Spital following its acquisition of parts of the village. When in 1536 Biberach introduced the Protestant reformation, Oberholzheim became Protestant as well. This meant that Catholic Gutenzell Abbey kept the responsibility for the maintenance of the church, but the instalment of Protestant clerics rested with the Protestant Spital in Biberach. During the Thirty Years' War, and in the course of the Catholic Counter-Reformation, a Catholic priest was installed in Oberholzheim in 1628, but had to abandon the parish after only four years in 1632. Up to 1803 two thirds of the village belonged to the Spital from Biberach and one third to Gutenzell Abbey.

During the course of the German mediatisation and the dissolution of Gutenzell Abbey, the part of the village belonging to the abbey became property of the Bavarian counts of Törring whereas the Spital property within the village was handed over to the Margraviate of Baden in 1803. Following the establishing of the Confederation of the Rhine in 1806 the whole of the village of Oberholzheim was incorporated into the Kingdom of Württemberg.

On 1 March 1972 Oberholzheim was incorporated into the municipality of Achstetten.

== Coat of arms ==
The coat of arms of Oberholzheim depicts a sword and a key, which are crossed, under a ploughshare. All three symbols are held in or and are on an escutcheon in azure. The sword and the key represent the patron saints of the local church, St Peter and Paul whereas the ploughshare refers to the agrarian history and nature of the village. The or and azure are taken from the coat of arms of Biberach indicating the historical connections with the city.

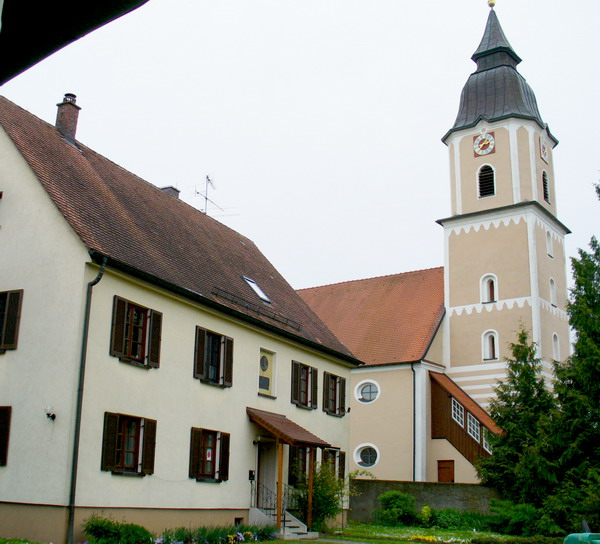
Place of birth of Christoph Martin Wieland

== Attractions ==
=== Parish church St Peter and Paul ===
A church and parish are first mentioned in the 10th century. In 1275 the church seemed to have still been affiliated to Weissenburg Abbey and already been dedicated to Saint Peter and Saint Paul. Remains of an earlier structure, incorporated into the current building, are the square base of the bell tower as well as the lower parts of the choir. The church was converted into Baroque style in 1739 under the guidance of Maria Bernarda von Donnersberg, abbess of Gutenzell Abbey. None of the Baroque furnishings have, however, survived the Neo-Gothic renovation carried out in 1874. Only a Noli me tangere painting attributed to Franz Carl Stauder remains. The Neo=Gothic altar, pulpit and baptismal font were installed in 1874. The ceiling was painted by Hans Gottfried von Stockhausen in 1953 and 1954.

=== Tithe barn ===
The tithe barn was erected in 1498 on instructions from Gutenzell Abbey. The abbey had the rights of tithes in the village. The building was reconstructed in 1767 and 1768 when an extension on the western side was built including a hip roof.

== Notable people from Oberholzheim ==
- Christoph Martin Wieland (1733 in Oberholzheim - 1813 in Weimar), German poet and translator in the Age of Enlightenment.

== See also ==
- Upper Swabia
