= Stetten (Achstetten) =

- Ortsteil of Achstetten
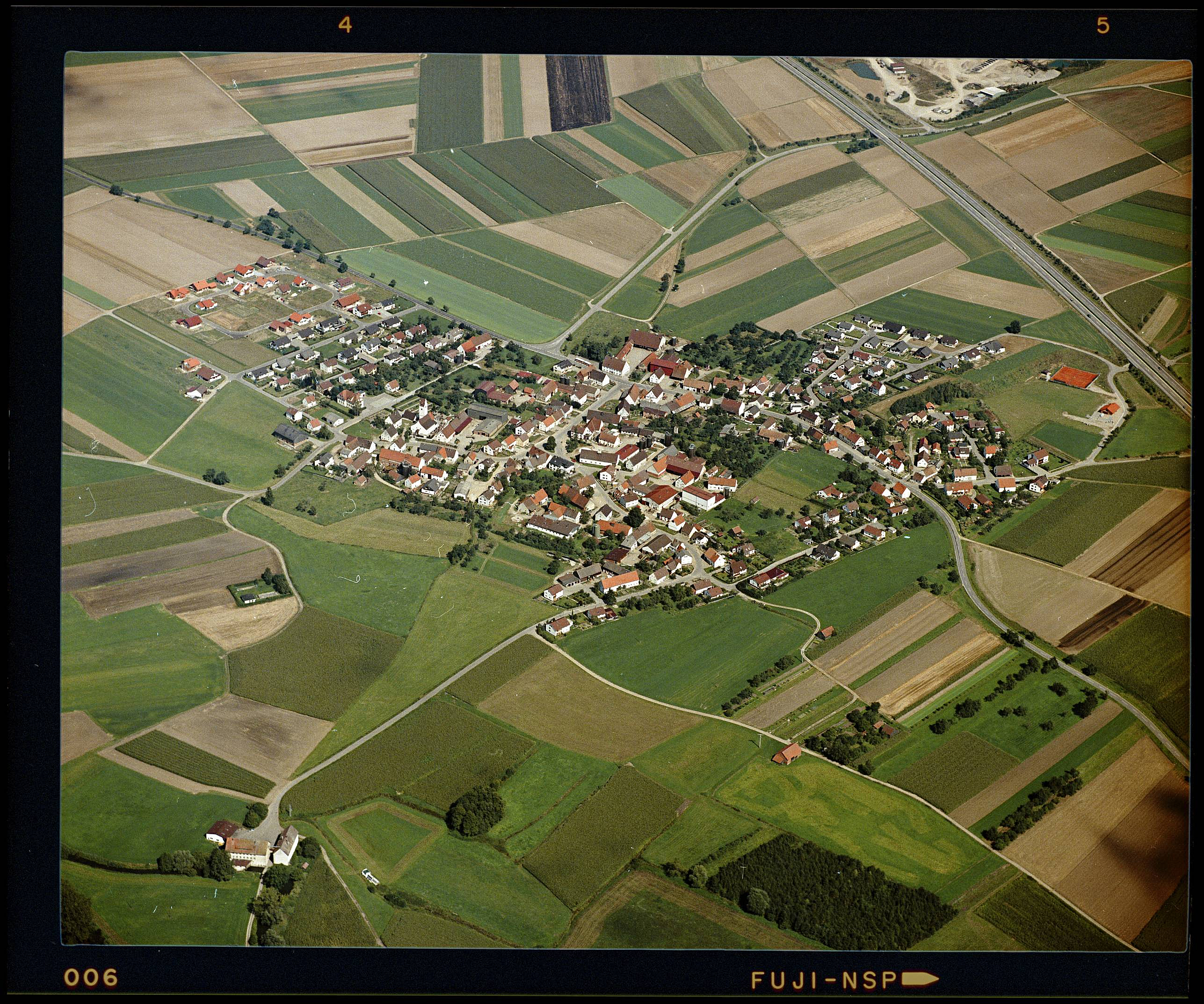
- Stetten

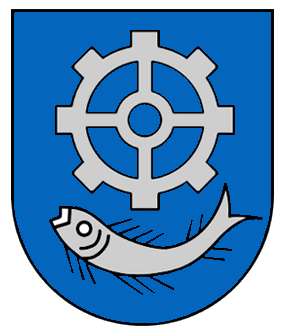
- Coat of arms
- Interactive map of Stetten
- Location within Germany Location within Baden-Württemberg
- Coordinates: 48°16′46″N 9°54′13″E
- Country: Germany
- State: Baden-Württemberg
- Admin. region: Tübingen
- District: Biberach
- Municipality: Achstetten
- Elevation: 499 m (1,637 ft)

Population (2019-12-31)
  - Total: 1,017
- Time zone: UTC+01:00 (CET)
  - Summer (DST): UTC+02:00 (CEST)
- Postal codes: 88480
- Dialling codes: 07392

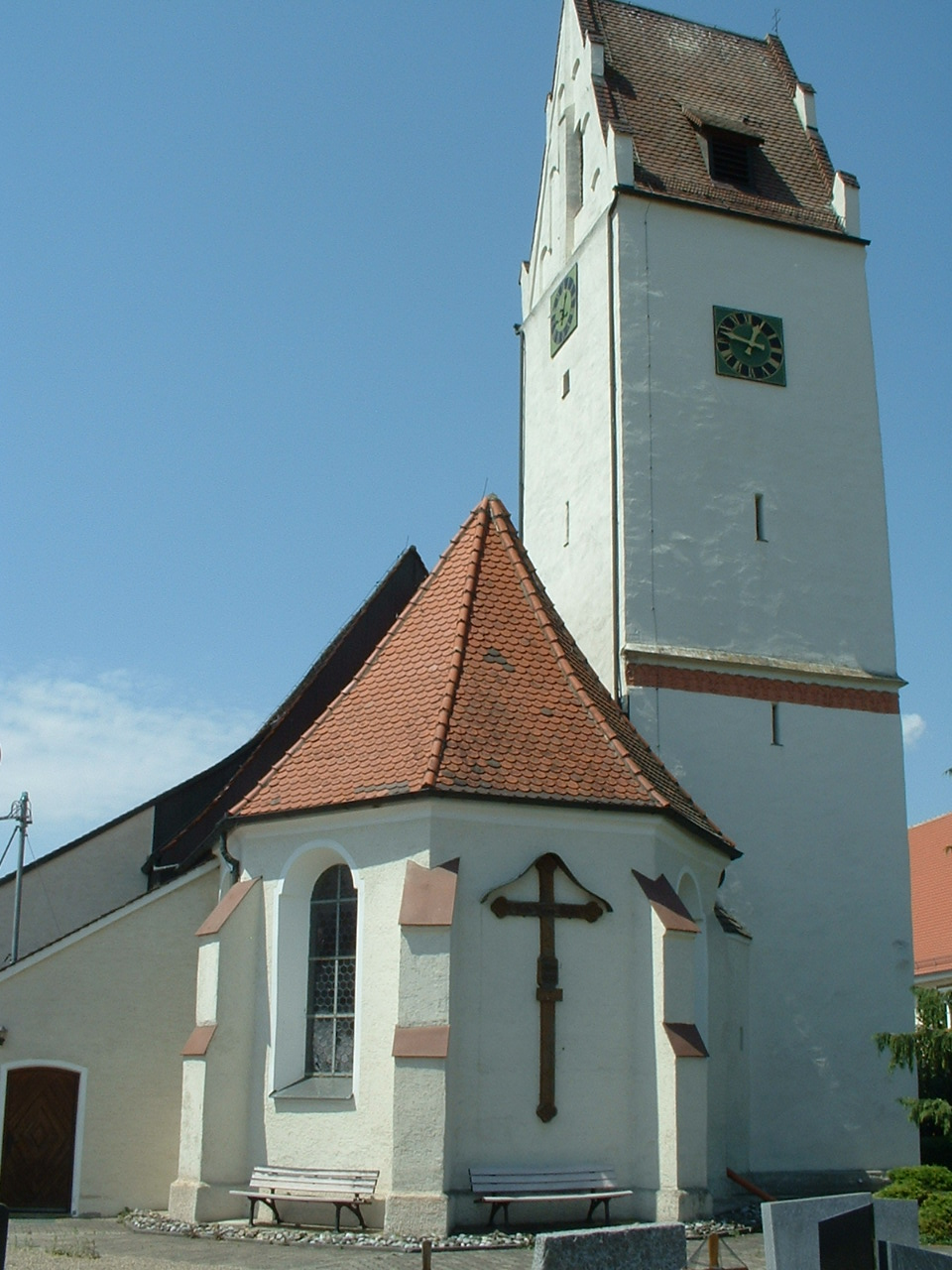
Parish church St Stephen

Stetten (German pronunciation: [ˈʃtɛtn̩]) is a village in the state of Baden-Württemberg, Germany, with a population of 1017. Administratively it is part of the municipality of Achstetten.

== Geography ==
Stetten is located 6 km north-east of Laupheim and 14 km south of Ulm on the district road 7522. To the north Stetten borders on Dellmensingen, part of the city of Erbach in Alb-Donau district, to the west and the south on Achstetten, and in the east on the municipality of Hüttisheim, also part of Alb-Donau district. The village is partly situated on a high plateau and partly on the slopes of the valley of the river Rot. To the east Stetten is confined by the federal road Bundesstraße 30.

== History ==
Stetten is first mentioned in a document dating from 1181 in which local nobility, Henricus de Stettin, is attested. In 1385, by which time the village had come into the possession of the lords of Freyberg, the existence of a castle is confirmed. Its location is presumed to have been south of the town hall near a stream running through the village. It soon fell into disrepair and disappeared completely. Eberhard von Freyberg sold Stetten to Ulm citizen Peter Wagner in 1385. Two years later Wagner sold the whole village on to Wiblingen Abbey. The Jus patronatus of the local church was also exercised by Wiblingen Abbey.

In the last years of the Thirty Years' War most of the village of Stetten was burnt down by Swedish troops in December 1646.

During the course of the German mediatisation and the dissolution of Wiblingen Abbey, the village became part of the Electorate of Bavaria in 1805, and following the establishing of the Confederation of the Rhine in 1806 it was incorporated into the Kingdom of Württemberg.

On 1 January 1975 Stetten was incorporated into the municipality of Achstetten.

== Coat of arms ==
The coat of arms of Stetten depicts a fish under a water wheel with four spokes and eight blades, Both are held in argent on an escutcheon in azure. The water wheel symbolises the formerly important cooperative watermill whereas the fish refers to fish farming, which by using ponds and by fishing in the river Rot also was an important trade in former times. The azure indicates the water both activities are connected with.

== Attractions ==
=== Parish church Saint Stephen ===
A church in Stetten was first mentioned in 1275 dedicated to Saint Stephen. The core of the current building is Late Gothic represented by its still existing choir. A tower was erected in 1555. The church was partially burnt down in 1646 during the Thirty Years' War by Swedish troops. At the beginning of the 18th century, the church was extended with a nave in Baroque style, work which seems to have included some interlacing stucco. In 1787 and 1788 the interior was overhauled in neoclassical style, and modernised during the 1880s. Still noticeable is the mannerist tomb of Augustin Wiedemann, abbot of Wiblingen Abbey from 1572, who had previously been priest at Stetten, as well as several carved statues depicting Saint Zacharias and Saint Elizabeth from around 1725, a processional cross and an effigy of the resurrected Christ from 1735. The statues of Saint Barbara and Saint Dorothea from 1490 originally belonged to the altar of Mary in Achstetten.

== See also ==
- Upper Swabia
