= Bihlafingen =

- Stadtteil of Laupheim
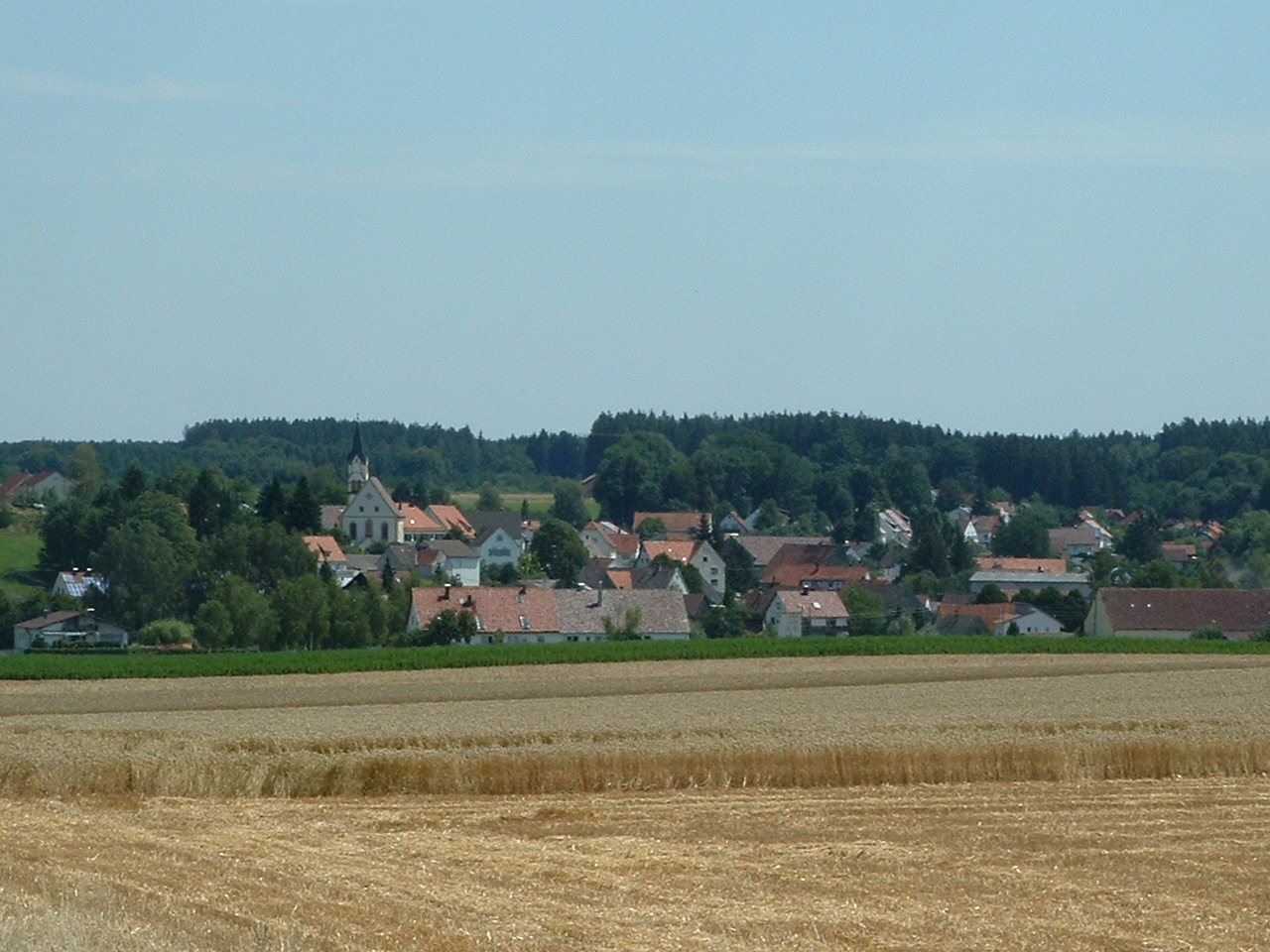
- Bihlafingen

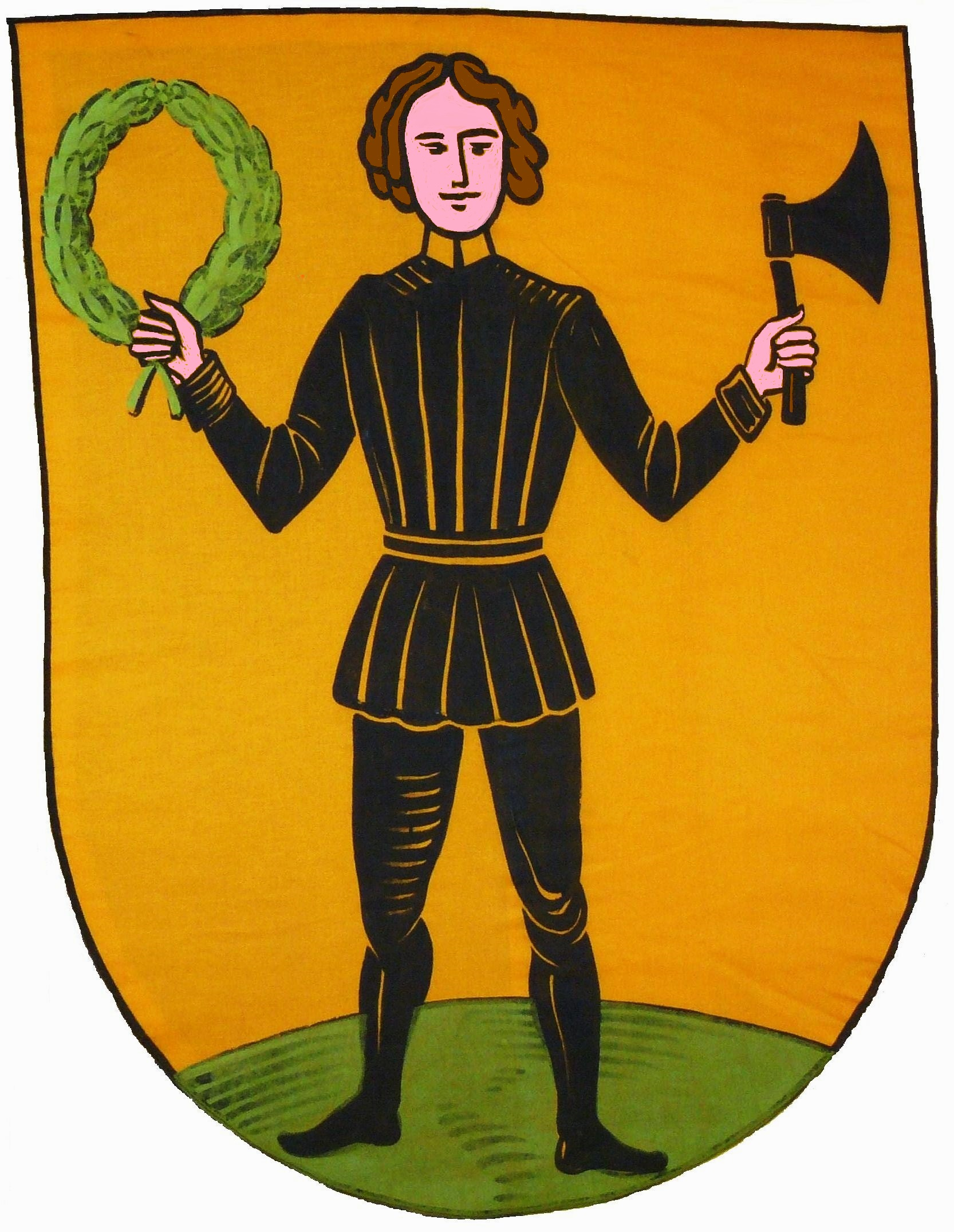
- Coat of arms
- Interactive map of Bihlafingen
- Location within Germany Location within Baden-Württemberg
- Coordinates: 48°15′32″N 9°47′20″E
- Country: Germany
- State: Baden-Württemberg
- Admin. region: Tübingen
- District: Biberach
- Town: Laupheim
- Elevation: 533 m (1,749 ft)

Population (2018-12-31)
  - Total: 848
- Time zone: UTC+01:00 (CET)
  - Summer (DST): UTC+02:00 (CEST)
- Postal codes: 88471
- Dialling codes: 07392

Bihlafingen is a village and part of the municipality of Laupheim, in the state of Baden-Württemberg, Germany and has a population of 848.

== Geography ==
Bihlafingen is an exclave of the municipality of Laupheim, being surrounded by the municipality of Achstetten to the west, the municipality of Burgrieden to the south, Hüttisheim to the north, and Schnürpflingen to the east. The latter two municipalities are part of the Alb-Donau-Kreis district.

Most of the village's built-up area is situated on the slopes of the river Schmiehe which runs through Bihlafingen.

== History ==
Bihlafingen is an Alamannic foundation, named after Pilolf, a leader or founder of an extended family. Bihlafingen was first mentioned in a document in 1129 as villa Pilolvingen and was mostly property of Wiblingen Abbey between 1318 and 1704. Up until then some property in Bihlafingen was owned by the Biberach Spital (a hospital foundation) which sold their remaining assets in 1704 to Wiblingen Abbey.

In 1635, during the Thirty Years' War, the population of Bihlafingen fell victim to the plague. Except for one man, who then moved to neighbouring Hüttisheim, the whole population perished and the village was abandoned until 1649 when the abbot of Wiblingen Abbey sent new settlers to repopulate the village.

The village church is dedicated to St Theodolus.

In 1749, tailor Mathias Eberle returned from a pilgrimage to Steingaden Abbey with a replica of the flagellated Christ. The following year Bihlafingen became a place of pilgrimage and has been ever since.

In March 1806, following the War of the Third Coalition and the defeat of the coalition, Bihlafingen, being he property of Wiblingen Abbey, became part of the Kingdom of Bavaria, only to be transferred to the Kingdom of Württemberg in September of the same year.

In 1972 the village of Bihlafingen was incorporated into the municipality of Laupheim.

== See also ==
- Upper Swabia
