= Bronnen (Achstetten) =

- Ortsteil of Achstetten
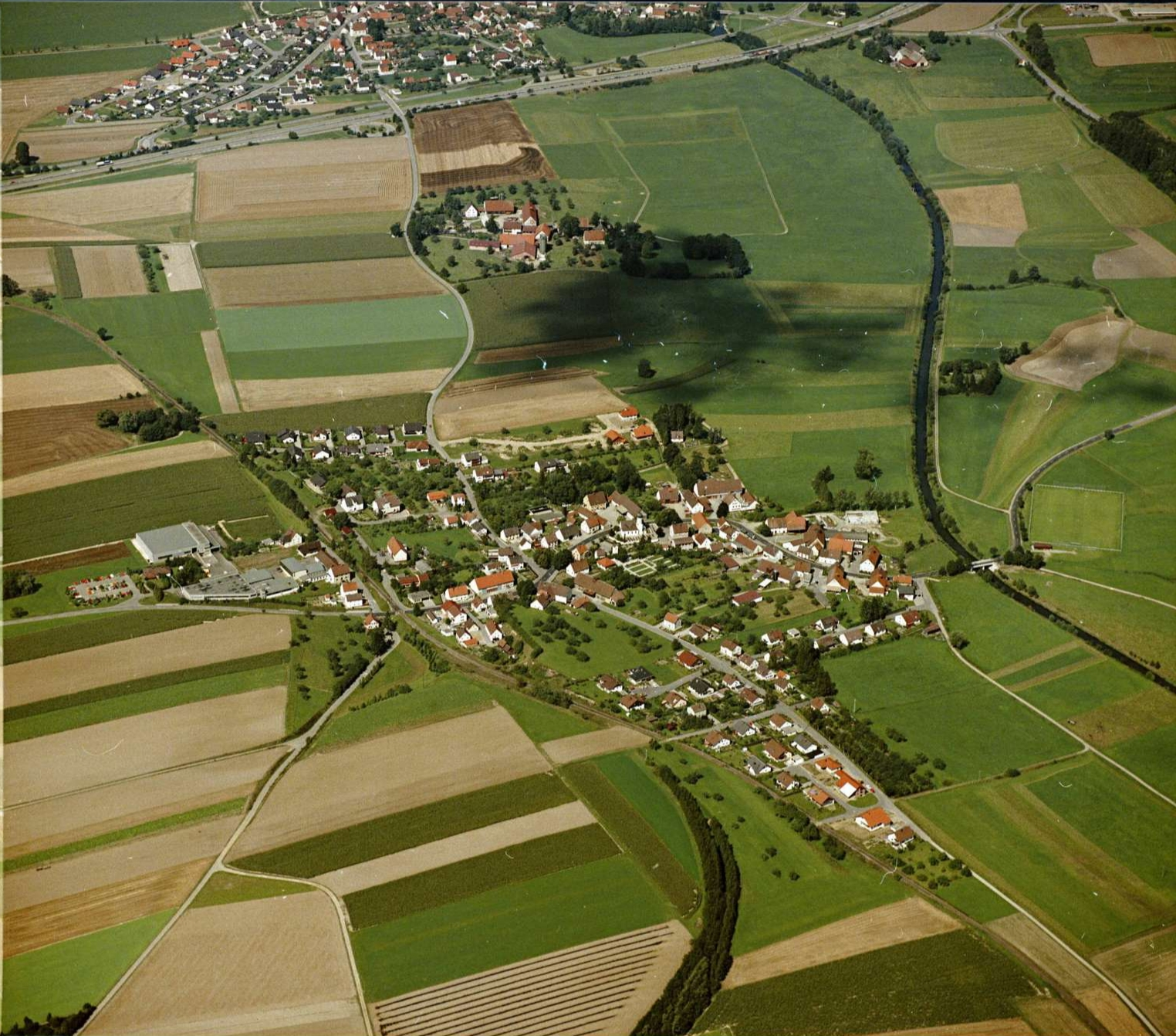
- Bronnen

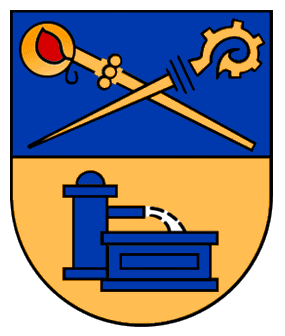
- Coat of arms
- Interactive map of Bronnen
- Location within Germany Location within Baden-Württemberg
- Coordinates: 48°14′45″N 9°54′22″E
- Country: Germany
- State: Baden-Württemberg
- Admin. region: Tübingen
- District: Biberach
- Municipality: Achstetten
- Elevation: 507 m (1,663 ft)

Population (2019-12-31)
  - Total: 706
- Time zone: UTC+01:00 (CET)
  - Summer (DST): UTC+02:00 (CEST)
- Postal codes: 88480
- Dialling codes: 07392

Bronnen is a village in the state of Baden-Württemberg, Germany, with a population of 706. Administratively it is part of the municipality of Achstetten.

== Geography ==
Bronnen is located 1 km south of Achstetten, being separated from it by the federal road Bundesstraße 30 and 2 km northeast of Laupheim on the district road 7519 The village borders the municipality of Burgrieden to the southeast. Bronnen is situated on a high plateau with some built-up area along the main road winding down the slope into the valley of the river Rot. In Bronnen there are numerous wells, hence the name of the village which is derived from the Old High German words brunno meaning well.

== History ==
The area of Bronnen has been settled from early times on. A number of Alemannic grave fields have been discovered within its boundaries. Bronnen itself was first mentioned as Brunnon in a document from 8 June 1157 in which a church in the village belonging to Saint Blaise Abbey is referred to. Bronnen seems to have had its own noble family since between 1265 and 1365 the lords of Bronnen appear in documents, the last one mentioned by name was knight Brun von Bronnen in 1352. From the end of the 14th century until 1639 Bronnen belonged to the lords of Freyberg zu Achstetten. High justice was executed by the Bailiwick of Swabia whereas low justice was in the hands of the lords of Freyberg from 1603 onwards. Following the death of the last lord, Philipp Eduard von Freyberg zu Achstetten, the village was after some legal disputes inherited by his four sisters whose heirs eventually sold it to Wiblingen Abbey in 1710. Low justice passed on first to Gutenzell Abbey in 1685 and, in 1769, to Wiblingen Abbey.

During the course of the German mediatisation and the dissolution of Wiblingen Abbey, the village became part of the Electorate of Bavaria in 1805, and following the establishing of the Confederation of the Rhine in 1806 it was incorporated into the Kingdom of Württemberg.

With the opening of the Laupheim–Schwendi railway line in 1904, Bronnen was connected by public transport to Schwendi and Laupheim.

On 1 November 1972 Bronnen was joined with the municipality of Achstetten.

== Coat of arms ==
The coat of arms of Bronnen is parted per fess (horizontally) depicting in the upper division a burning golden candle and a golden crosier on azure, the candle being an attribute of St Blaise while the crozier represents the various monasteries under whose jurisdictions Bronnen fell or which had certain rights within the village. The lower division shows a village well on or, the well being canting arms representing the name Bronnen. The tinctures azure and or were taken from the coat of arms of Saint Blaise Abbey to which the church of Bronnen had been affiliated.

== Economy ==
Until the mid-20th century Bronnen was predominantly agrarian-oriented. Today the largest single employer is Erwin Halder KG with approximately 200 employees, manufacturing metal parts and components.

== Attractions ==
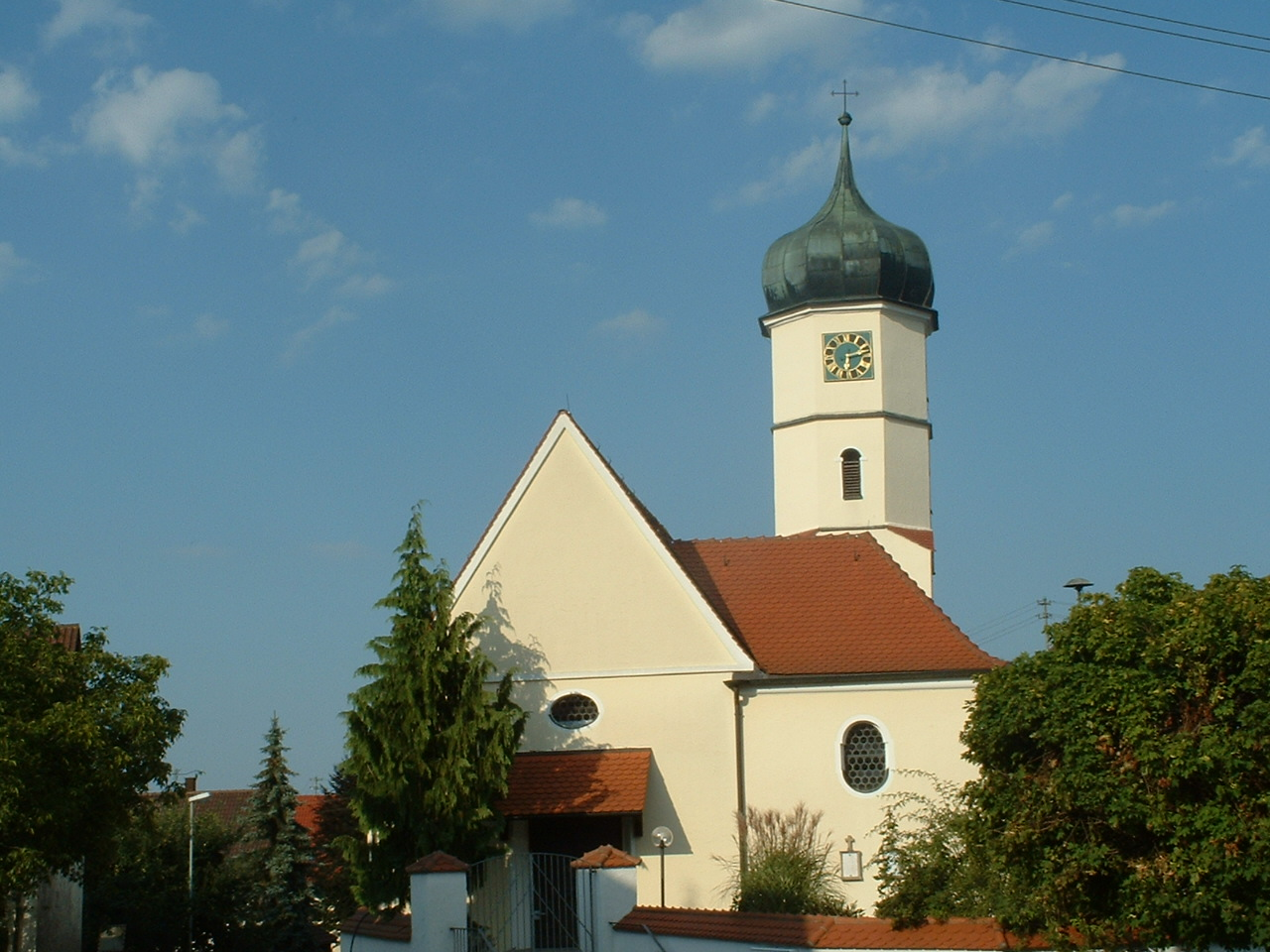
Parish church St Blaise and Margaret in Bronnen

=== Parish church Saint Blaise and Margaret ===
A church in Bronnen was first mentioned in the 12th century. In 1520 it was dedicated to St Margaret and in 1584 also to St Blaise. The core of the current building is Late Gothic but was converted to Baroque style in the 17th and 18th century. In 1658 a tower was added, followed by new panelling in 1667, and Apostle figures in 1672. The interior was further reshaped in Baroque and Rococo styles between 1711 and 1721 and again between 1731 and 1737 with contributions by painter Martin Weller from Ehingen and sculptor Dominikus Hermenegild Herberger from Dietenheim who created a processional cross and statues of the St Blaise and St Margaret. Between 1869 and 1868 the church's interior was redesigned in Neo-Romanesque style during which most of the Baroque and Rococo interiors were removed. In 1933 the nave was extended and a sacristy was added. In 1997 and 1998 the whole structure was renovated.

== See also ==
- Upper Swabia
