= Bronnen =

Bronnen may refer to

- Arnolt Bronnen (1895-1959), Austrian playwright and director
- Bronnen (Achstetten), a village in Upper Swabia, Germany
