= Hüttisheim =

- Municipality
- Coat of arms

- Location of Hüttisheim within Alb-Donau-Kreis district
- Interactive map of Hüttisheim
- Location within Germany Location within Baden-Württemberg
- Coordinates: 48°16′47″N 9°56′34″E
- Country: Germany
- State: Baden-Württemberg
- Admin. region: Tübingen
- District: Alb-Donau-Kreis

Government
  - Mayor (2022–30): Daniel Roth

Area
  - Total: 10.35 km^{2} (4.00 sq mi)
- Elevation: 538 m (1,765 ft)

Population (2025-12-31)
  - Total: 1,551
  - Density: 149.9/km^{2} (388.1/sq mi)
- Time zone: UTC+01:00 (CET)
  - Summer (DST): UTC+02:00 (CEST)
- Postal codes: 89185
- Dialling codes: 07305
- Vehicle registration: UL
- Website: www.huettisheim.de

Hüttisheim is a municipality in the district of Alb-Donau in Baden-Württemberg in Germany.

The municipality is a member of the local government association Kirchberg Weihungstal headquartered in Illerkirchberg.

== Geography ==
Hüttisheim lies between the Danube and Iller about 8 km from Laupheim and about 17 km south of Ulm on the river Schmiehe. The hamlet of Humlangen is administratively incorporated into Hüttisheim.

== Neighboring communities ==
The municipality is bordered to the north to the city of Ulm, on the east by Staig and Schnürpflingen in Alb-Donau-Kreis, to the south with the district Bihlafingen the city Laupheim in Biberach district and on the west by Achstetten, also in the district of Biberach.

== History ==
Hüttisheim is first mentioned in a document dated 1152 as "Hittinishaim" confirming the rights of Rot an der Rot Abbey of some property in the village. Through donations both Rot an der Rot Abbey and Wiblingen Abbey were in possession of the village. From about 1450 the entire village was, however, owned by Wiblingen Abbey until the monastery's dissolution in 1806. During the German Peasants' War the village was burnt down in 1525. High justice remained with the Count of Kirchberg, the founders of Wiblingen Abbey. The crosier in the coat-of-arms of Hüttisheim represents the almost four hundred years of being ruled by the abbey.

== Council ==
The last local elections ( municipal council, county council ) for a term of five years was on June 7 of 2009.

== Mayor ==
- 1945-1946 Frau von Borowsky
- 1948-1986 Matthew Merz (1921–2003)
- 1986-2002 Frieder Ehni
- 2002-2004 Bernd Porter (independent) from Laupheim
- 2004-2006 is the mayoralty vacant
- 2006-2014 Stefan Gert Hofer ( CDU )
- Since June 2006 Hüttisheim has no full-time mayor any more. The Hüttisheimer IT manager Stefan Gert Hofer was the first time volunteer (part-time) mayor

== Things ==
=== Regular events ===
Annually plays the theater group of the Musikverein Hüttisheim in the town hall. Information about the performances can be found on the homepage of the Musikverein. The Garden Party in Humlangen has a long tradition and is also aligned by the Musikverein. The garden party always takes place at Corpus instead. Since 2005, a village festival takes place, in which actions are offered in several farmsteads situation.

== Education ==
Kindergarten "Little Rascals " Primary school

== Personality ==
=== Freeman ===
1986 Mayor Matthew Merz
