= Achstetten =

- Municipality
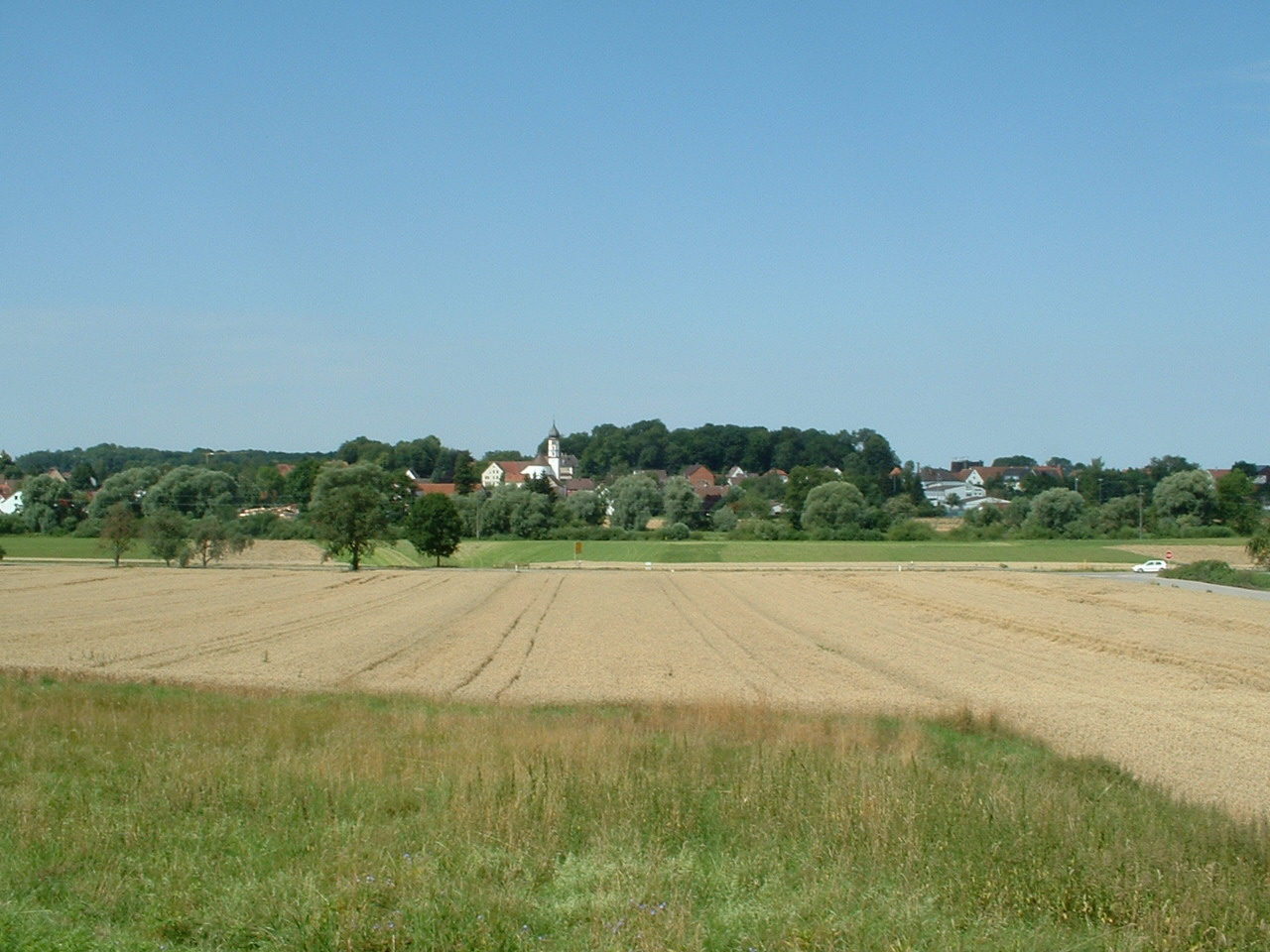

- Coat of arms

- Location of Achstetten within Biberach district
- Interactive map of Achstetten
- Location within Germany Location within Baden-Württemberg
- Coordinates: 48°15′35″N 9°53′51″E
- Country: Germany
- State: Baden-Württemberg
- Admin. region: Tübingen
- District: Biberach
- Subdivisions: 4

Government
  - Mayor (2022–30): Dominik Scholz

Area
  - Total: 23.38 km^{2} (9.03 sq mi)
- Elevation: 503 m (1,650 ft)

Population (2025-12-31)
  - Total: 5,258
  - Density: 224.9/km^{2} (582.5/sq mi)
- Time zone: UTC+01:00 (CET)
  - Summer (DST): UTC+02:00 (CEST)
- Postal codes: 88480
- Dialling codes: 07392
- Vehicle registration: BC
- Website: www.achstetten.de

Achstetten (German pronunciation: [ˈaxʃtɛtn̩]) is the northernmost municipality in the district of Biberach, in the region of Upper Swabia in Baden-Württemberg, Germany.

The villages of Oberholzheim, Bronnen and Stetten were incorporated into the municipality of Achstetten between 1972 and 1975.

== Geography ==
The strung-out village is situated west of the federal road Bundesstraße 30. The river Rot runs through it. Achstetten lies approximately 4 km (2.5 mi) north of the city of Laupheim and approximately 18 km (11 mi) south of the city of Ulm.

The name Achstetten is derived from the Old High German words aha meaning water, and stet, meaning place; the name meaning thus place close to water.

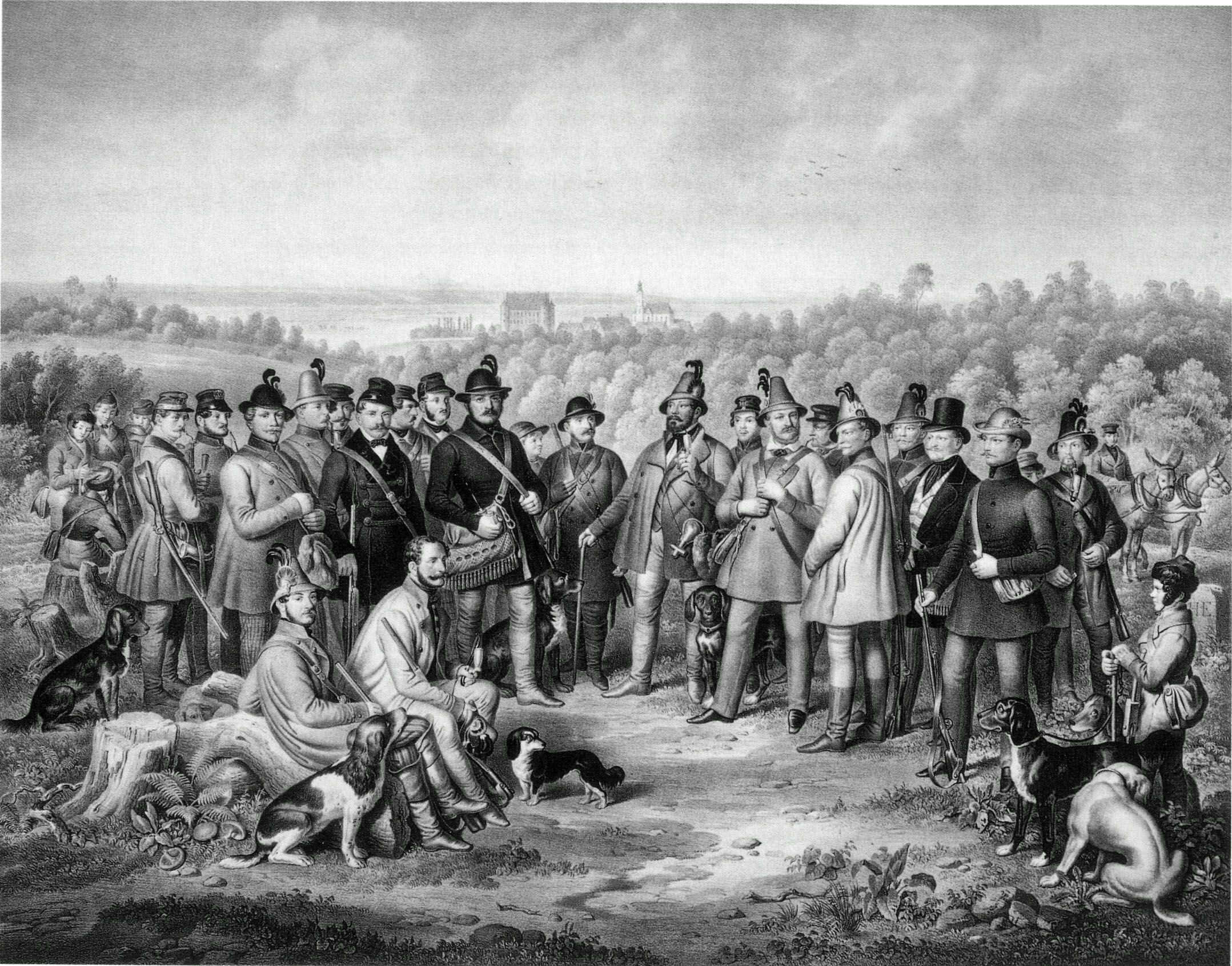
Hunting party with Karl Viktor Cäsar Reuttner von Weyl (sitting, left)

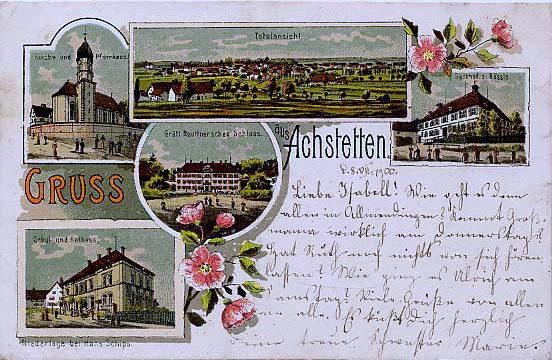
Achstetten, ca. 1900

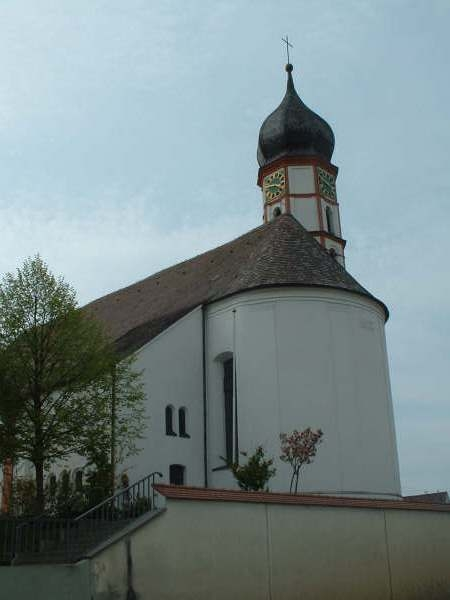
Parish church St Oswald and Agatha

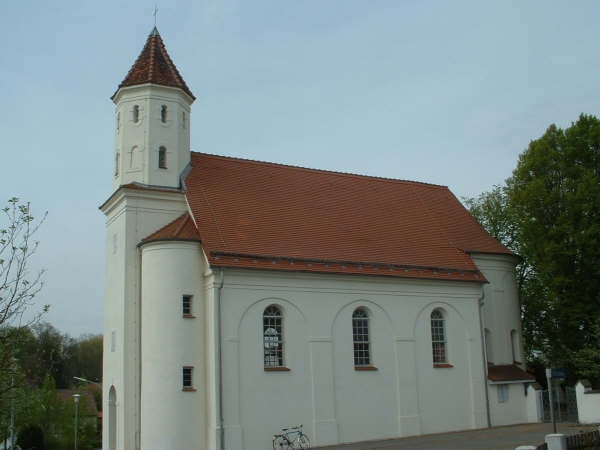
Chapel of the Annunciation

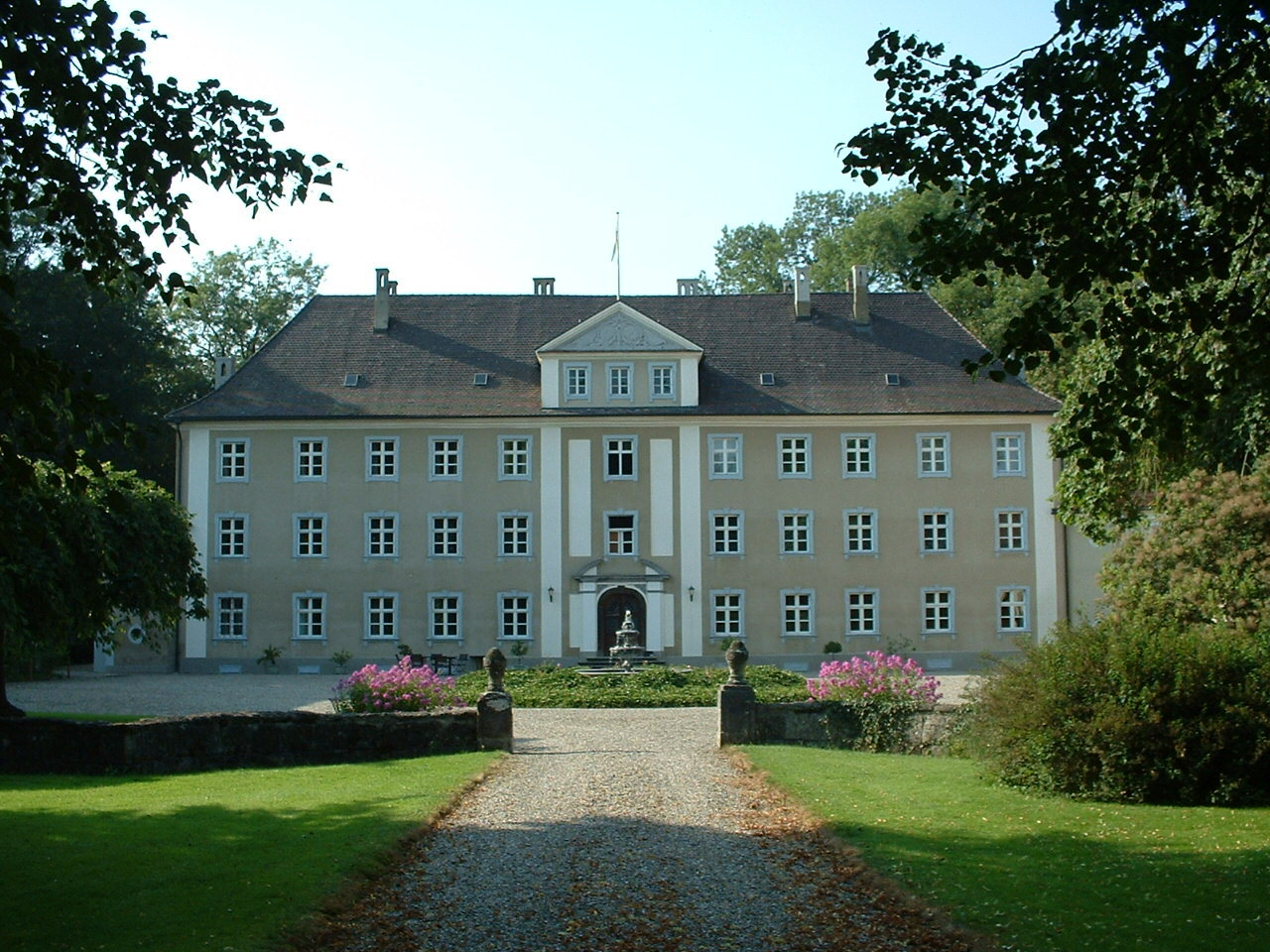
Castle Achstetten

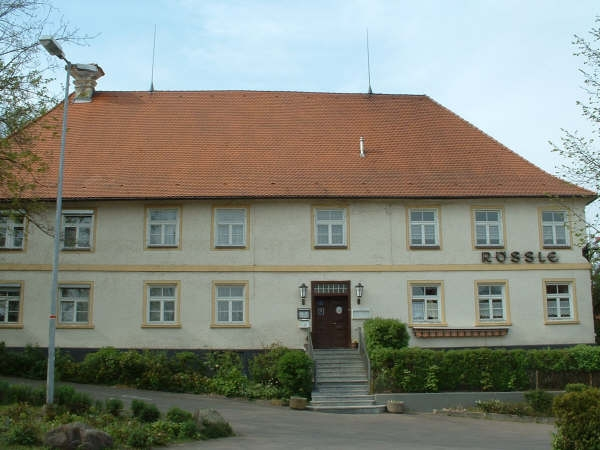
Country Inn Rössle

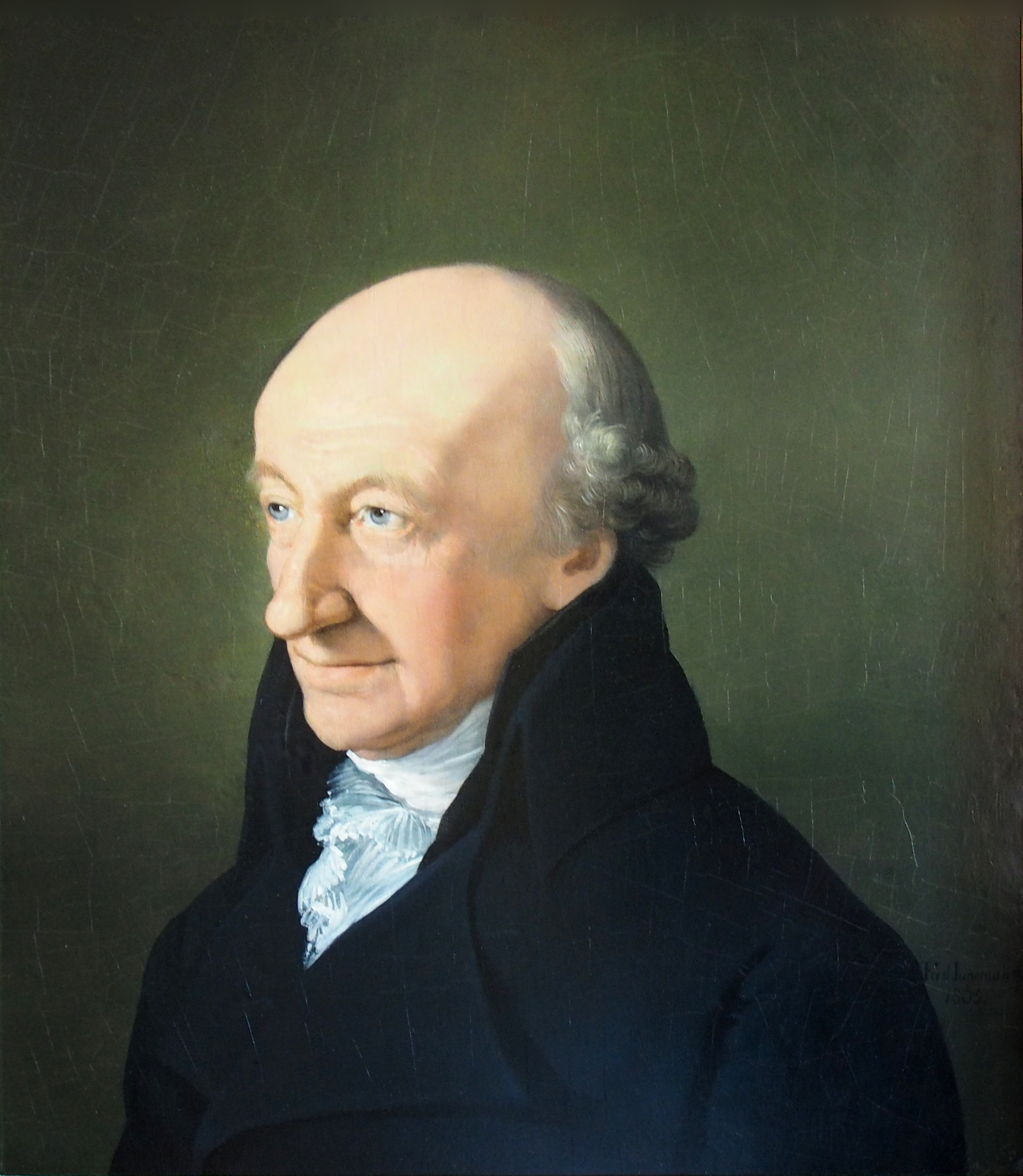
Christoph Martin Wieland, 1805

== History ==
Close to the road to Ersingen, tumuli from the Hallstatt period have been discovered. This indicates that the area has been settled for at least 2500 years. Celtic tribes are associated with Hallstatt culture.

During the Roman period, Achstetten was also a place of settlement, indicated by the remains of Roman villa. The outlines of this structure are visible on aerial photographs.

The Hil(de)gartstraße in Achstetten is a reminder of an early mediaeval trade route. It is a relic of a route leading from Konstanz via Meersburg towards Ulm and then further via Heidenheim to Aalen and Würzburg, terminating at Fulda. There is evidence to indicate that a road towards the crossing of the river Iller branched off on the territory of Achstetten. This road would then lead on towards Regensburg.

Achstetten is first mentioned in a charter dated 1194. This charter was signed by Pope Celestine III, confirming the rights of Wiblingen Abbey in Asteten. The possessions of the monastery of Wiblingen in Achstetten were, however, certainly older than 1194.

From 1356 to 1447, the Freiherrn von Freyberg were the sole rulers of Achstetten. In 1442, the rule over Achstetten was divided amongst three brothers, Eberhard von Freyberg, Hans von Freyberg and Wilhelm von Freyberg. However, in 1447, Wilhelm von Freyberg sold his part to Gutenzell Abbey. As a consequence, the Freiherrn von Freyberg were forced to share the rule of the village with Gutenzell Abbey until 1625.

In 1594, Ochsenhausen Abbey bought the second half of the revenues made from tithes, having already owned the first half for some time.

Through marriage, the two remaining parts of Achstetten came into the possession of the Counts of Öttingen-Spielberg in 1689. They exchanged it in 1765, so that from 1765 onwards, it was part of the landed territories of the Freiherrn von Welden. The Freiherrn von Welden sold it on 12 May 1795 to the last Komtur of the Teutonic Knights, the Freiherr Beat Conrad Reuttner von Weyl. He transferred his possession to his nephew Julius Cäsar Reuttner von Weyl, who, in 1802, bought the rights of the revenue from the complete tithes from Ochsenhausen Abbey. He was elevated to the rank of count in 1819. To this day, his successors are owners of the Lordship of Achstetten.

Following the secularization in 1803, the Counts of Toerring-Gutenzell became the inheritors of the share of Gutenzell Abbey, part of which had, since 1449, also been the hamlet of Mönchhöfe.

As part of the mediatization, Achstetten became temporarily part of Bavaria in 1805, only to be handed over to the newly formed Kingdom of Württemberg in 1806.

After having initially been part of the district of Wiblingen, it became part of the district of Laupheim in 1845. On 1 October 1938, Achstetten became part of the district of Biberach.

On 1 March 1972, the formerly independent municipality of Oberholzheim was incorporated into Achstetten, followed on 1 November 1972 by Bronnen and on 1 January 1975 by Stetten.

== Coat of arms ==
The three silver balls on blue were taken from the coat of arms of the Freiherrn of Freyberg who ruled the village from 1356 to 1625. The red and silver banderole is a reminder of the Cistercian abbey in Gutenzell with whom the Freiherrn of Freyberg shared authority over the village from 1447 onwards.

== Attractions ==
=== Parish church St Oswald and Agatha ===
Originally, Achstetten was part of the parish of Laupheim. It became an independent parish in 1442, when the Freiherrn von Freyberg founded a new parish, subordinate to the monastery of Ochsenhausen.

The monastery of Ochsenhausen had the church St Oswald and Agatha built in Renaissance-style in 1625, replacing a late mediaeval structure at the same location.

In 1823, the spire was raised and a new top was added. The interior was last renovated in 1932 and a new pipe organ was installed in 2000.

The gallery is separated into two parts, one part designated for the general public, and a second part into which only the former rulers of Achstetten, members of the dynasty of Reuttner von Weyl, were permitted. The compartment for the aristocracy is connected to the castle by a passageway, built on wooden columns. A similar structure existed in Laupheim. There, however, the passageway is only preserved in fragments.

=== Chapel of the Annunciation ===
The Chapel of the Annunciation was built ca. 1650, immediately after the Thirty Years' War, as a burial church for the Freiherrn von Freyberg. Following the acquisition of Achstetten by the Counts of Reuttner von Weyl in 1795, the chapel has been used as the final resting place for members of that family. The structure of the chapel is marked by flat wall-pillars on the interior as well as the exterior, a semi-circular choir and a pointed-topped spire.

=== Castle ===
A castle was first mentioned in 1386. The original castle was burnt down in 1525 during the German Peasants' War after the Baltringer Haufen had stormed the building. A rebuilding of the castle at the same location was mentioned in 1583. The last Komtur of the Teutonic Knights, Freiherr Beat Conrad Reuttner von Weyl, had a new castle built by the official architect of the Teutonic Knights, Franz Anton Bagnato, between 1794 and 1796.

=== Country Inn Rössle ===
As early as 1449, a tavern was mentioned to have existed in Achstetten. In 1573, the two lordships over Achstetten determined that apart from this one, no other tavern or inn was to be allowed in Achstetten. Even then, the inn was used as a place for gatherings where the villagers would discuss and decide local affairs. The present building was erected at the beginning of the 18th century and continued to serve as a country inn until 2008 when it was converted into individual flats. In 2010, the designation of the building was changed when the local council approved plans by developers to establish a hostel for travelling tradesmen on the premises.

== Notable people from Achstetten ==
- Christoph Martin Wieland (5 September 1733 in Oberholzheim; 20 January 1813 in Weimar), German poet and translator in the Age of Enlightenment.
- Oscar Ameringer (4 August 1870 – 5 November 1943) Socialist author, newspaper editor, and organizer

== See also ==
- District of Biberach
- Upper Swabia
- Baden-Württemberg
- Upper Swabian Baroque Route
