= Gutenzell Abbey =

Coordinates: 48°06′49″N 9°59′51″E

Imperial Abbey of Guntenzell Reichsabtei Gutenzell
- 1417–1803
- Coat of arms

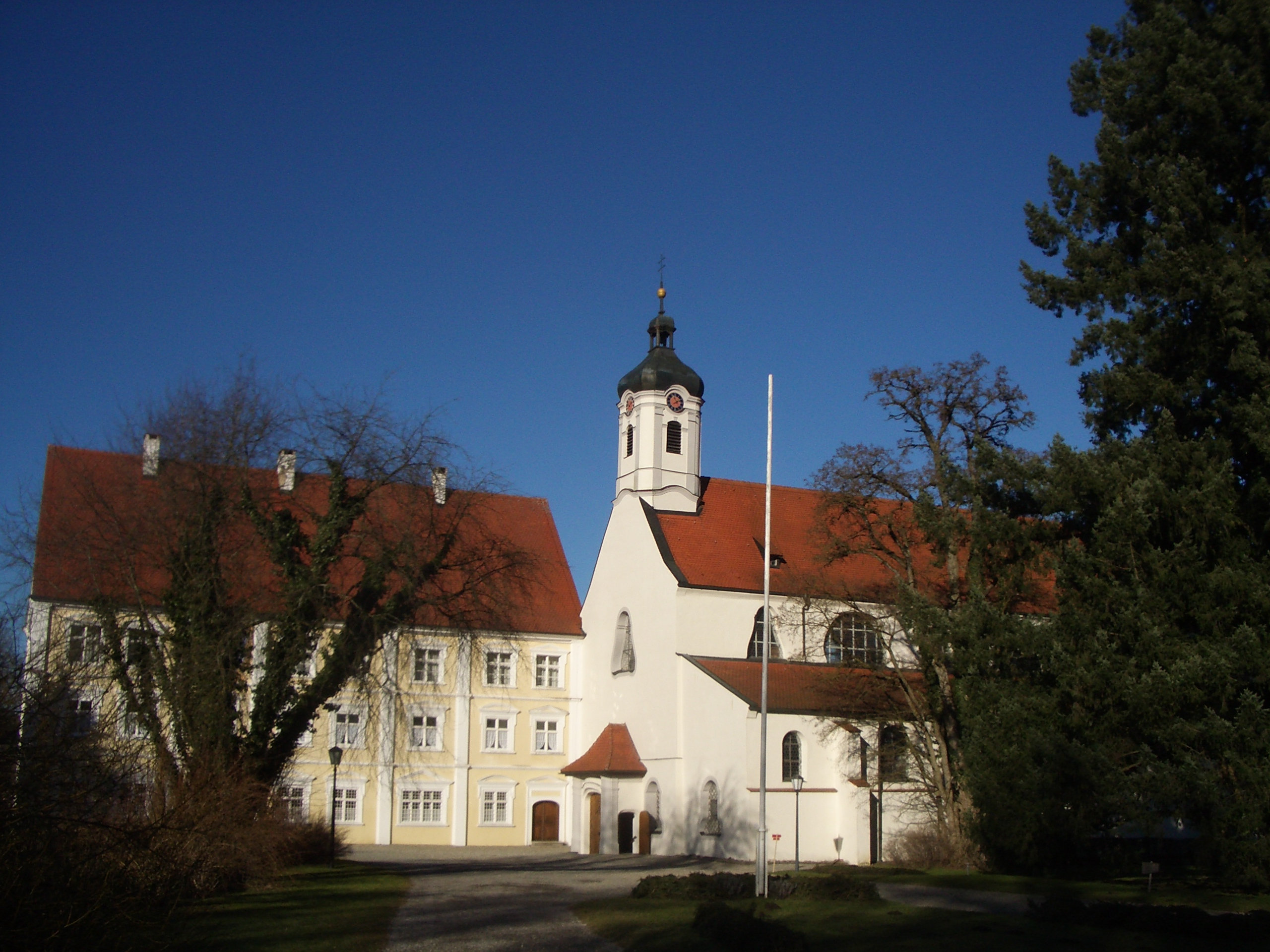
- Parish Church Saints Cosmas and Damian, former monastery church
- Status: Imperial Abbey
- Capital: Gutenzell Abbey
- Common languages: Alemannic
- Government: Theocracy
- Historical era: Middle Ages
  - Refounded: 1237
  - Granted immediacy by Emperor Sigismund: 1417
  - Abbess represented in Swabian Circle by chamberlain: from 1521
  - Looted by Baltringer Haufen during Peasants' War: 1525
  - Granted high justice: 1685
  - Secularised to Toerring: 1803
  - To Württemberg: 1806
Preceded by	Succeeded by
Duchy of Austria	County of Toerring
- Today part of: Germany

Gutenzell Abbey (German: Reichsabtei Gutenzell) was a Cistercian nunnery in the municipality of Gutenzell-Hürbel in the district of Biberach, Baden-Württemberg, Germany.

The origins of the monastery are unknown. According to legend, the monastery was founded in the 12th century by two sisters of the aristocratic family Schlossberg (in later tradition called Schlüsselberg), whose castle was nearby, and called in Cella Dei, rendering Gottes Zelle in German.

However, the first record of Gutenzell Abbey was its refoundation, or possibly confirmation, charter from 1237 as a Cistercian monastery under the name of Bona Cella, Gute Zelle in German, hence Gutenzell. In its early days the monastery was favoured and supported particularly by the noble family of Aichheim. The first abbess of Gutenzell Abbey was Mechthilda von Aichheim ruling from 1237 to 1243. Other local noble families also patronised the abbey. Following a huge fire in the period between the original foundation and the reconfirmation in 1237, several nobles of the surrounding area provided means for reconstructing the monastic buildings. During its history, the monastery housed predominantly noble women.

Already in 1238, the refounded abbey was officially recognised by Pope Gregory IX who also put it under the spiritual supervision of Salem Abbey which lasted until 1753 when the task was transferred to Kaisheim Abbey.

Most parts of the monastery had to be rebuilt in 1369 following a disastrous fire caused by lightning.

In 1474 the monastery church Saints Cosmas and Damian became the parish church of the village of Gutenzell which had developed around the abbey. As it now stands, it is a medieval structure re-worked in the Baroque style. However, the origins of the church can be dated back to the 12th century, indicated by traces in its walls.

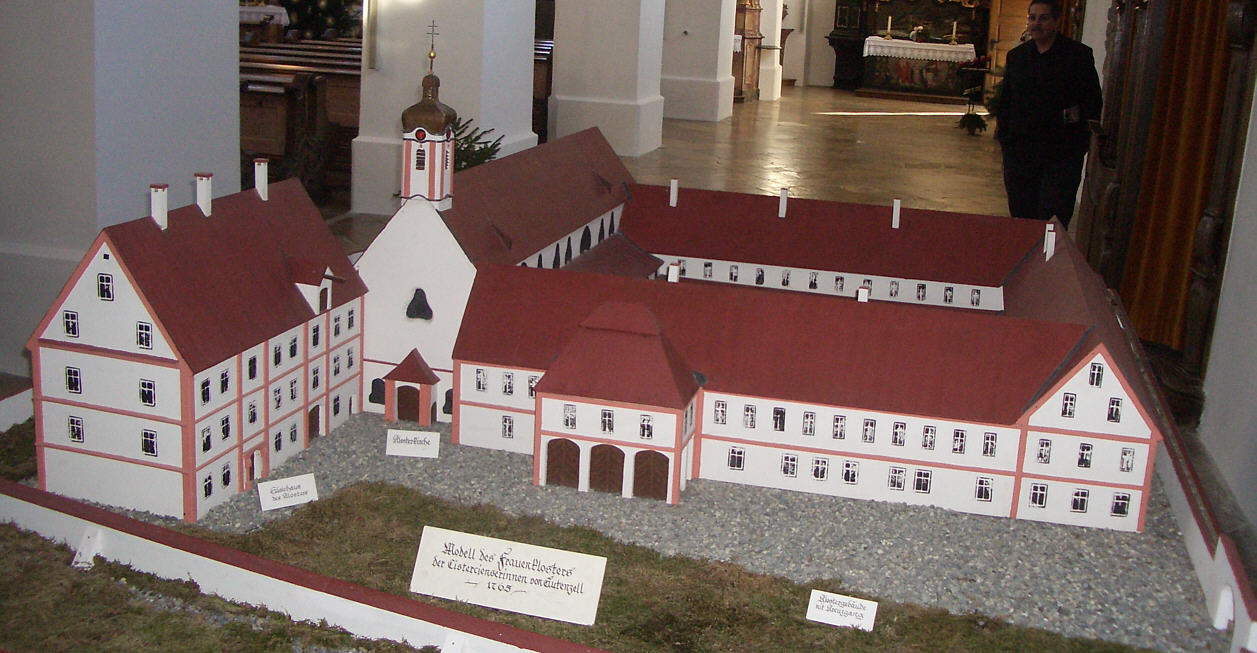
Gutenzell Abbey in the 18th century (model)

In the Later Middle Ages Gutenzell Abbey gradually managed to achieve imperial immediacy, the legal basis of which was formed by two privileges by Emperor Sigismund in 1417 and 1437. From 1521, the abbey's chamberlain represented the Abbess of Gutenzell during meetings of the Swabian Circle.

A fire in 1522 caused considerable damage, destroying the cloister.

In 1525 the abbey was looted by revolting farmers of the Baltringer Haufen during the German Peasants' War.

During the Thirty Years' War the nuns fled approaching Swedish troops to Styria in 1632. The convent remained there until 1647, shortly before the end of the war in 1648. However, on their withdrawal, Swedish troops laid fire to the abbey in December 1646.

In 1685 Gutenzell Abbey received the privilege of inflicting high justice.

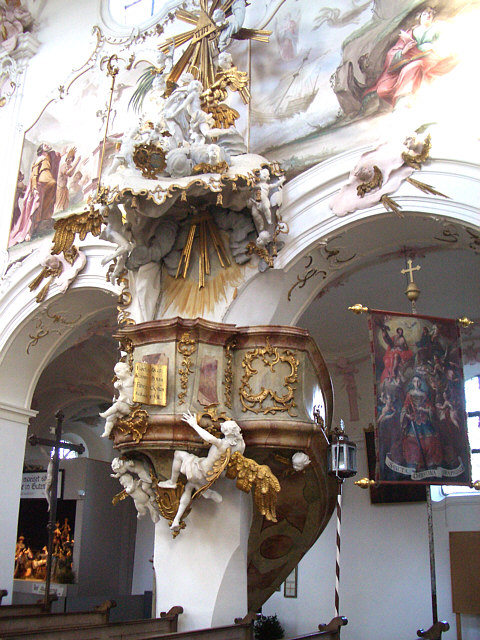
Pulpit at monastery church

In the second half of the 18th century the last major refurbishment of the monastery church was carried out in 1755-56 by the Wessobrunn stuccoist Franz Xaver Feuchtmayer the Elder, possibly following plans by Dominikus Zimmermann, whose daughter Maria Alexandra was prioress at the time. Later she would be abbess from 1759 to 1776. The frescoes are by Johann Georg Dieffenbrunner. The pulpit from 1756 was made by Stephan Luidl who also created the high altar in 1762, possibly also to designs by Dominikus Zimmermann.

At the beginning of the 19th century, Gutenzell Abbey was in possession not only of the village of Gutenzell but also owned parts of other villages with a total of 1189 subjects. Amongst others it ruled over a third of the villages of Achstetten, Kirchberg and Oberholzheim.

In 1803, the abbey was dissolved during secularisation and its assets transferred first to the Counts of Toerring, and then in 1806 to the Kingdom of Württemberg. At that time Gutenzell Abbey housed 36 nuns, a number which had been more or less consistent since the 16th century. The abbey was given a new rule by the Württemberg government which now functioned as superior. However, new nuns were not allowed to enter the convent. 28 nuns still lived in the monastery in 1812. The tradition of Gutenzell Abbey became extinct with the death of the last nun in 1851, the last abbess, Maria Justina von Erolzheim, having already died in 1809.

The premises were almost entirely demolished in 1864.

The former monastery church is now part of the Upper Swabian Baroque Route.

== Literature ==
- Maegraith, Janine Christina, Das Zisterzienserinnenkloster Gutenzell: vom Reichskloster zur geduldeten Frauengemeinschaft, Epfendorf, 2006. ISBN 3-928471-66-X
- Beck, Otto (ed.), Gutenzell: Geschichte und Kunstwerk, München, 1988. ISBN 3-7954-0679-X.

== See also ==
- Cistercians
- Imperial Abbey
- Upper Swabia
