= Bundesstraße 30 =

Federal highway in Germany

B 30
- Bundesstraße 30

Route information
- Length: 105 km (65 mi)

Location
- Country: Germany
- States: Baden-Württemberg, Bavaria

Highway system
- Roads in Germany; Autobahns; List; Federal; List; State; E-roads

The Bundesstraße 30 (abbreviated B30) is a highly frequented federal highway in Germany running through Upper Swabia in Baden-Württemberg from Ulm to Friedrichshafen on Lake Constance. It has a length of approximately 105 km (approximately 65 miles).

== Course ==
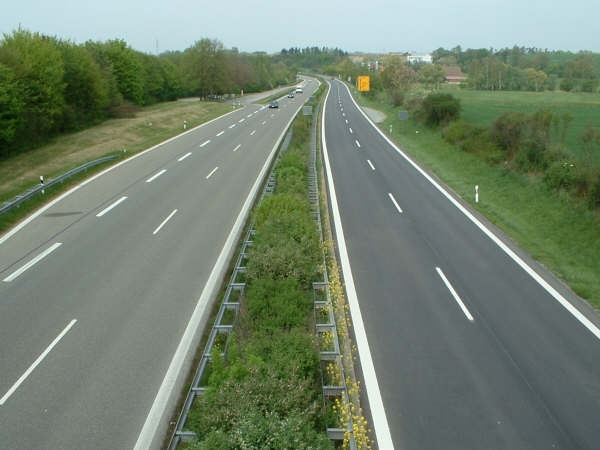
Dual carriageway B30 near Achstetten

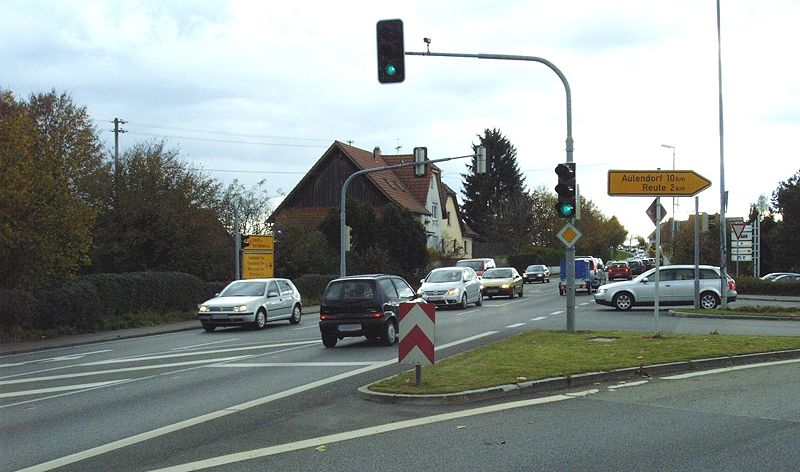
B30 in Gaisbeuren

The B30 starts at Ulm, passing the cities of Laupheim, Biberach an der Riß, Bad Waldsee, Weingarten and Ravensburg, terminating at Friedrichshafen. Originally planned to continue to Günzburg and passing the motorway interchange at Neu-Ulm, this stretch has never been completed. The motorway junction at Neu-Ulm, however, has partially been completed.

The first 40 km (approximately 25 miles) from Ulm to Biberach are laid out as a dual carriageway.

From junction Biberach-South to Oberessendorf, the Bundesstraße 30 is a single lane road extended with an alternating extra lane for overtaking.

From Oberessendorf to Baindt the road is a single lane road. The only traffic lights on the whole route can be found in Gaisbeuren, north of Ravensburg.

A bypass of Ravensburg as dual-lange carriageway leads to the Southern parts of Ravensburg. The stretch of the original federal road between Baindt and Ravensburg has been downgraded to the status of a Landesstraße, the L 313.

From Ravensburg to Friedrichshafen, the B 30 is again a single lane road.

== History ==
Originally designated as Württembergische Staatsstraße 49, during the re-numbering of the road network in 1932, it became Reichsstraße 30 with the maintenance being taken over by the Reichsstraßenverwaltung in 1934. Already in 1936, a bypass of Ravensburg was planned. Due to World War II, this was not built. Instead, in 1961, a bypass of Bad Waldsee was completed as a single lane carriageway.

In 1981, works started on the Ravensburg bypass which is almost complete except for a stretch to the south of Ravensburg.

== Problems ==
Lorries trying to avoid the motorway toll by using federal highways, have caused an increase of traffic on secondary roads. This has led to slow-moving traffic southbound from junction Biberach-South onwards. In case of road accidents, traffic frequently comes to a complete standstill. During the various holiday seasons, many motorists, trying to evade heavy traffic on the motorways nearby (A7 and A96), contribute, in conjunction with the increase in lorries, to additional congestion.

When in October 2004, major roads works were carried out between Enzisreute and Ravensburg, the importance of the B30 as a major traffic artery became apparent. Diversionary routes up to 60 km (37 mi) were necessary that had to split into two different routes. On the first day of the road works, there were traffic jams of more than 4 km (2.5 mi) at the exits leading to the diversions. On the diversions themselves, traffic collapsed completely at times. The road works enabled the inhabitants of Gasibeuren to measure the width of the B30, showing that the road in Gaisbeuren is up to 16 metres (17 yards) wide.

== Future ==
Since 1963, the state of Baden-Württemberg aims in the long term to convert the B30 first into a motorway-like federal highway and consequently into the motorway A89. At this point in time, only the stretch from Ravensburg-South to Friedrichshafen is included into the plans of the federal government. The road works for the extension from Ravensburg Süd to Meckenbeuren, started in 2013.

Except for the stretches just outside Ulm and between Ravensburg and Friedrichshafen, the part of the B30 between Bad Waldsee and Ravensburg counts the highest traffic density, where up to 22.000 vehicles each day were recorded. However, there are plans for a reconstruction of this stretch. These plans are currently only at an embryonic stage, with the only concrete planning being an extension at Enzisreute. Gaisbeuren is particularly badly affected by the intense traffic flow but plans for improvement are not as yet known. Any improvement will have to wait for at least 20 years.

Due to the extension of the road network in the former German Democratic Republic, funding for traffic projects in the state of Baden-Württemberg was cut severely. As a consequence, even the most basic maintenance work on the B30 could often not be carried out, due to the lack of financial resources.

Since then, the federal state of Baden-Württemberg has received more funding from the federal government for maintenance and extension work of the road system, which, however, are still quite modest.
