= Schmiehe =

River in Germany

Location
- Country: Germany
- State: Baden-Württemberg

Physical characteristics
- Mouth
  - location: Rot
  - coordinates: 48°18′01″N 9°53′55″E
- Length: 10.0 km (6.2 mi)

Basin features
- Progression: Rot→ Danube→ Black Sea

Schmiehe (also: Schmiechen) is a river of Baden-Württemberg, Germany. It flows into the Rot in Dellmensingen.

== See also ==
- List of rivers of Baden-Württemberg
