= Wiblingen Abbey =

Former Benedictine abbey

- Kloster Wiblingen
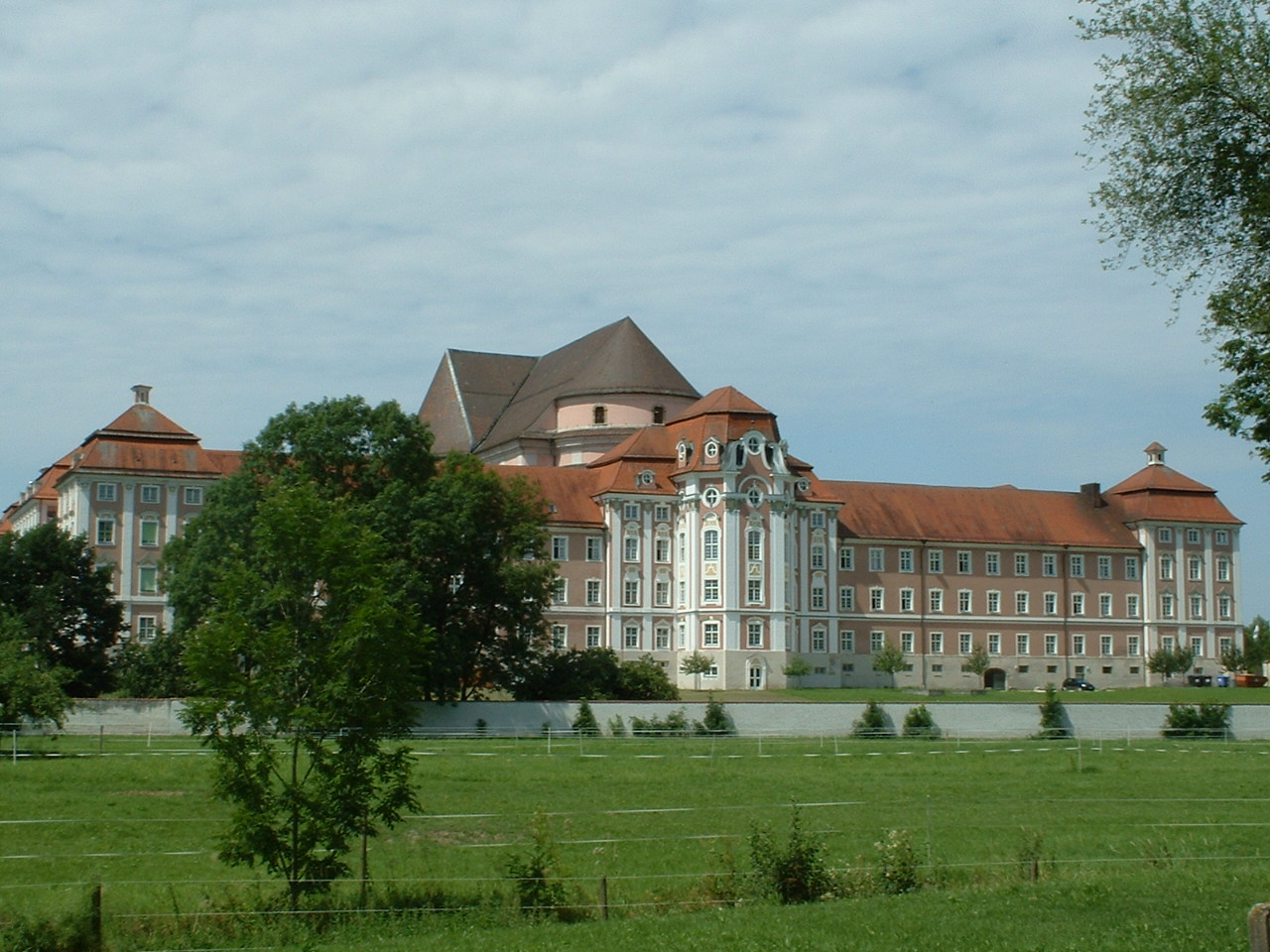
- Interactive map of Wiblingen Abbey

Monastery information
- Order: Benedictines
- Established: 1093
- Disestablished: 1806

People
- Founders: Hartmann von Kirchberg, Otto von Kirchberg, counts of Kirchberg

Architecture
- Architect: Christian Wiedemann
- Style: Baroque

Site
- Coordinates: 48°21′25″N 9°59′18″E
- Public access: yes
- Website: www.kloster-wiblingen.de

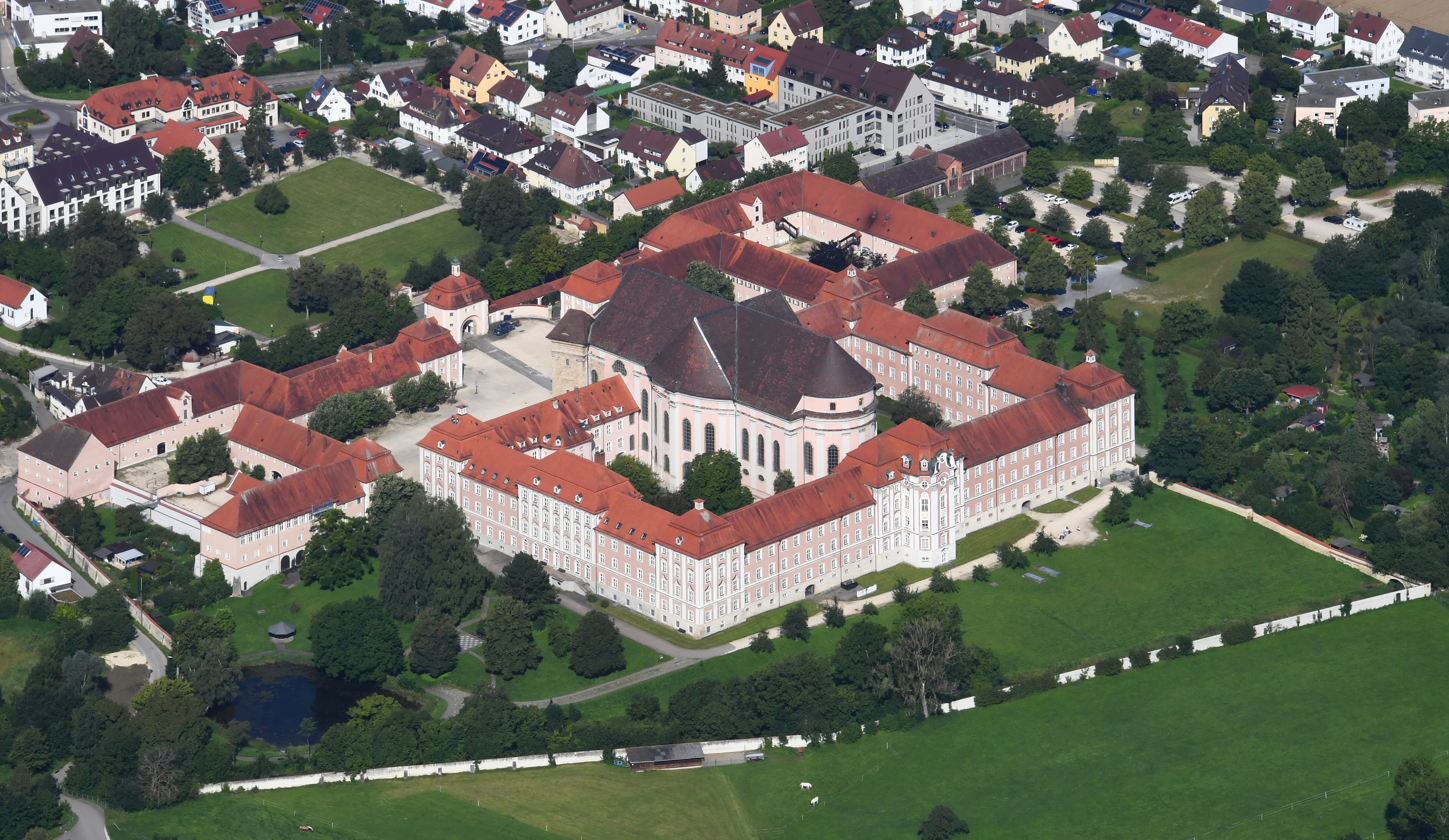
Aerial view of the Wiblingen Abbey

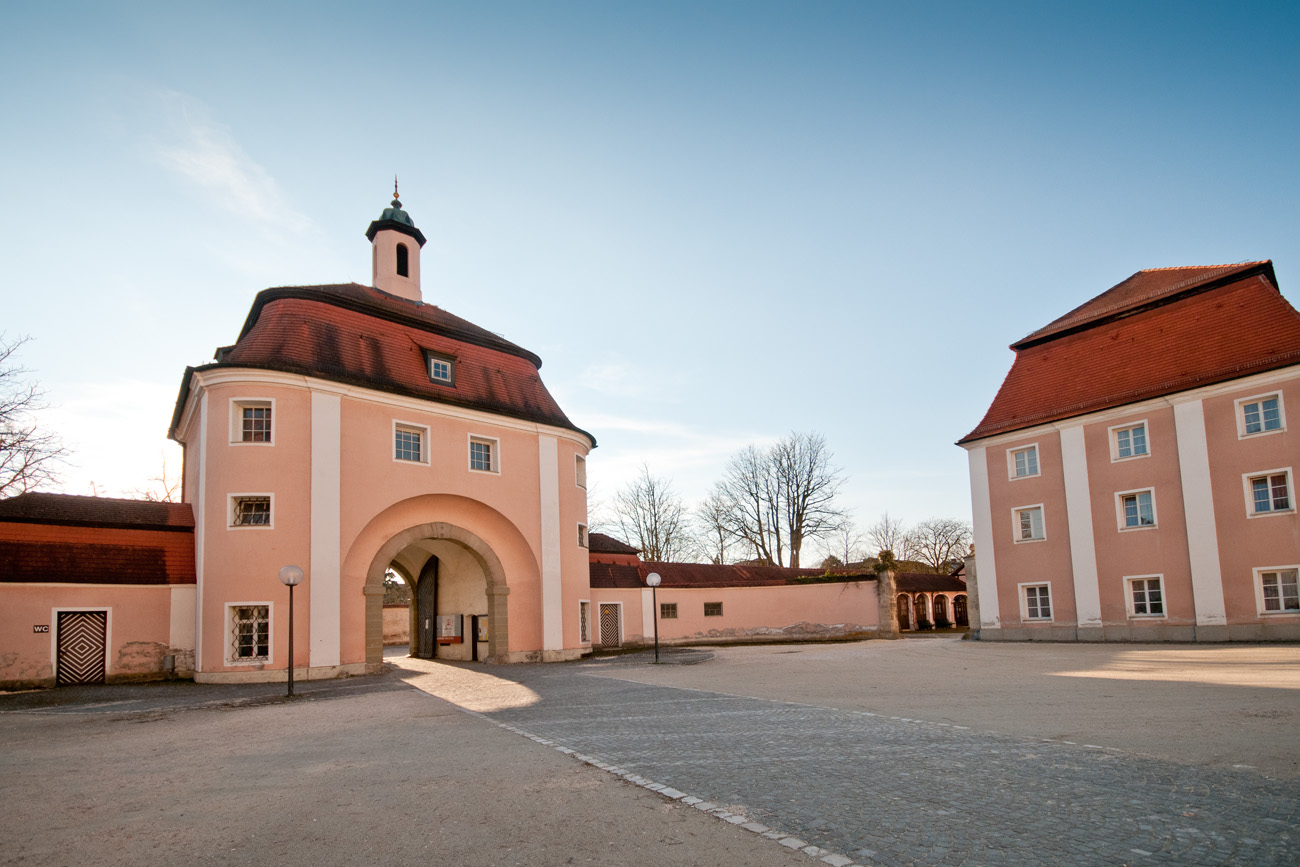
Abbey Gate

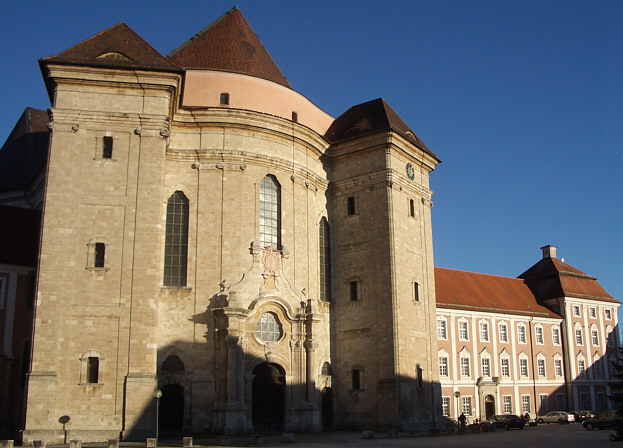
Abbey church with unfinished towers and southern wing of monastery

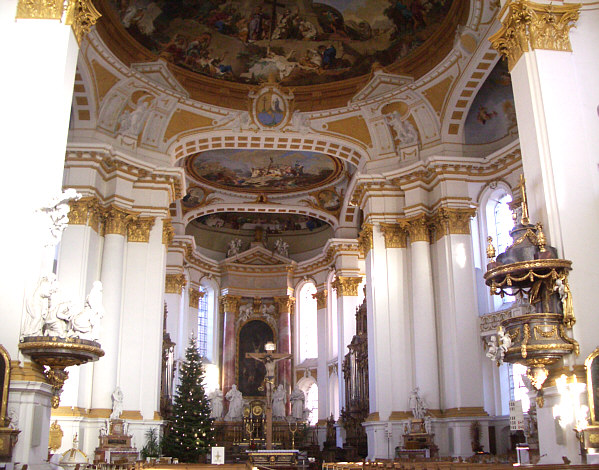
Interior of Abbey church

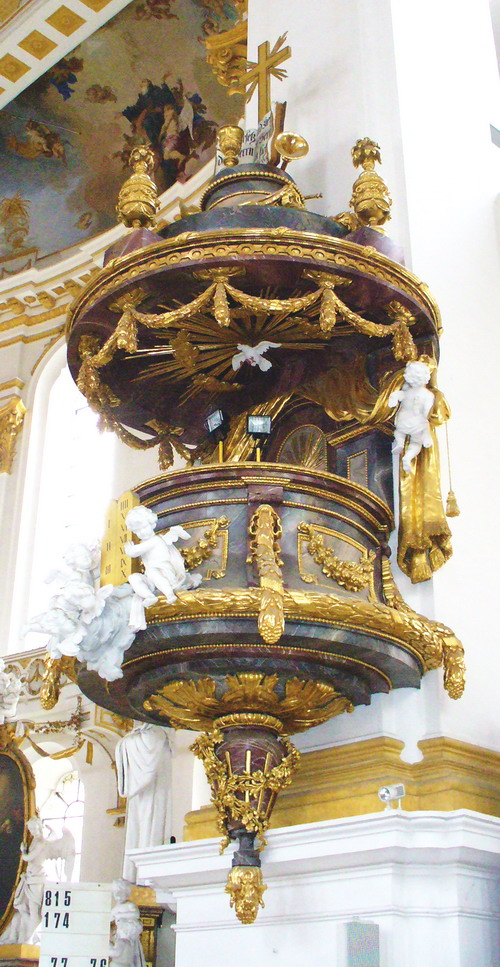
Chancel by Fidel Sporer

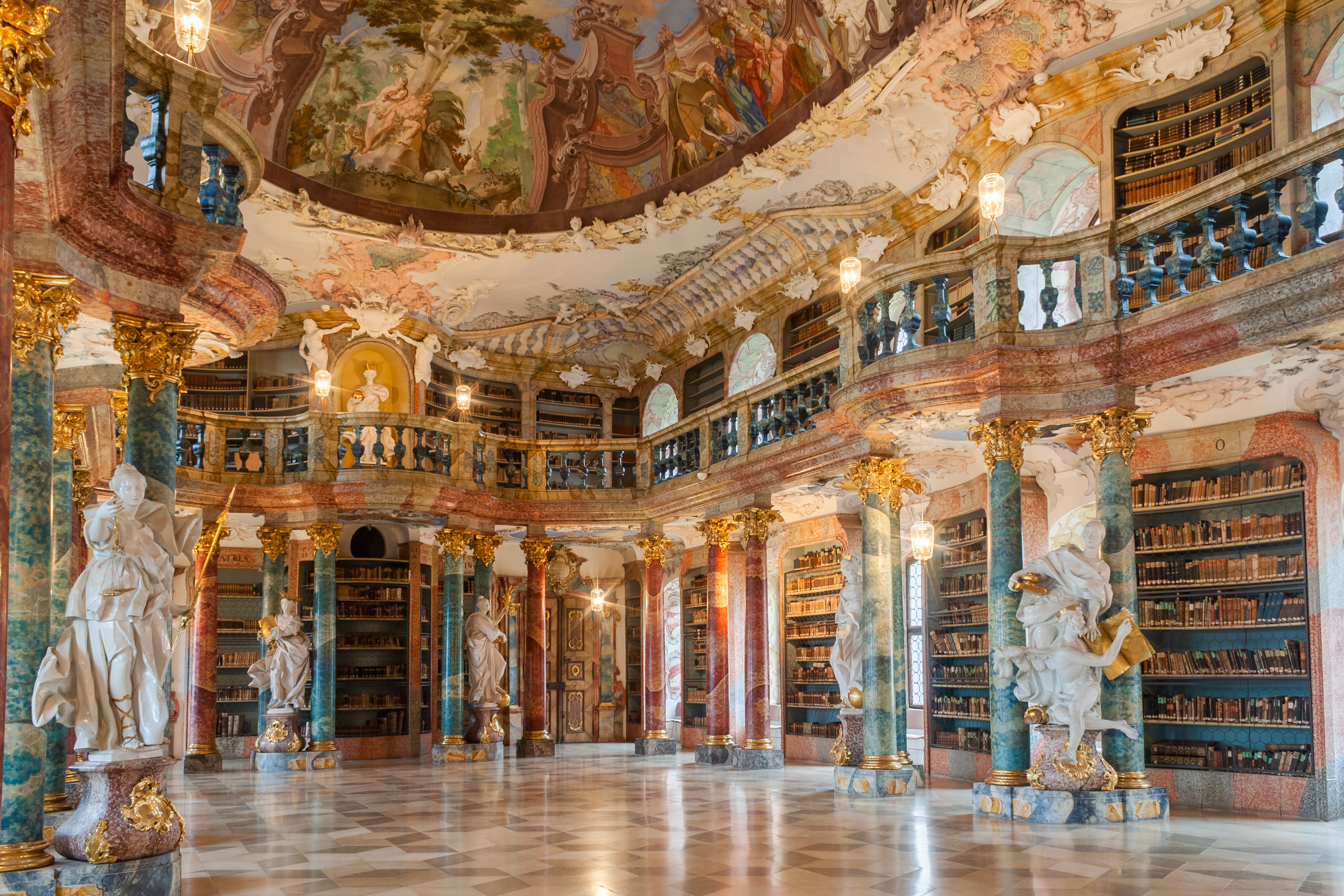
Library interior

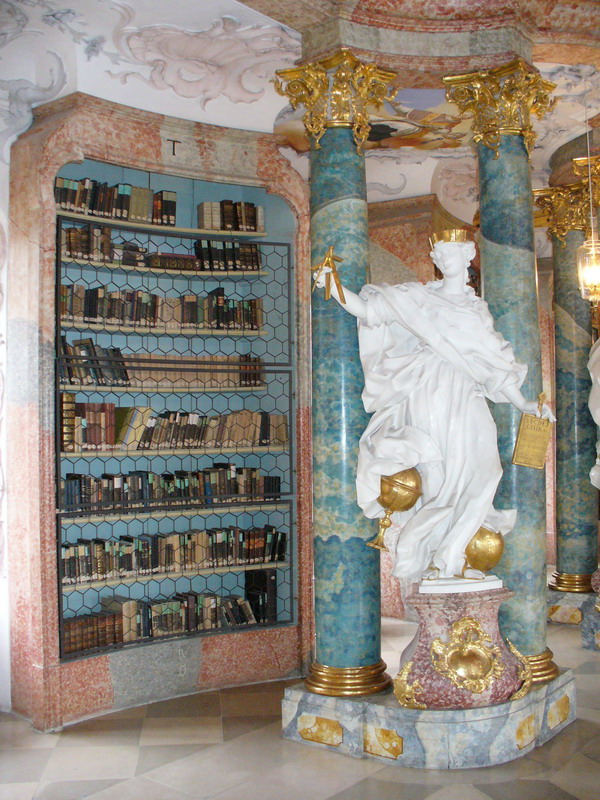
Bookshelf in library

Wiblingen Abbey was a former Benedictine abbey that was later used as barracks. Today its buildings house several departments of the medical faculty of the University of Ulm. The former abbey is located south of the confluence of the rivers Danube and Iller, south of the city of Ulm in the German state of Baden-Württemberg. Administratively, the former independent village of Wiblingen now belongs to the city of Ulm. The abbey is part of the Upper Swabian Baroque Route.

== History ==
=== From the foundation to 1701 ===
Wiblingen Abbey was founded in 1093 by the counts Hartmann and Otto von Kirchberg in Southern Germany. The counts offered monks of St. Blaise's Abbey in the Black Forest lands near the river Iller, which the monks used to found a filial institution. In 1099, the first buildings were consecrated. The first abbot was Werner von Ellerbach. In the same year, the founding counts offered the abbey a splinter of the Holy Cross that they had acquired during their participation in the First Crusade.

During the High and the Late Middle Ages Wiblingen Abbey was famous for its scholarship and learning as well as being a place of exemplary monastic discipline due its strict adherence to the rule of St. Benedict. In 1504, the Benedictine Abbey and its dependent villages came under the sovereignty of the House of Austria and was to be from then on part of Further Austria until 1806.

During the Thirty Years' War the abbey suffered repeatedly from warfare. On the initiative of Abbot Johannes Schlegel the Holy-Cross-Relic was hidden in order to protect it from marauding Protestant Swedish troops. However, following the withdrawal of the Swedish troops the relic could not be recovered, since there was no one alive who remembered its hiding place, the witnesses to its concealment all having succumbed to the plague. Only years later, the immured relic was rediscovered.

Due to the efforts of Abbot Benedict Rauh, whose term in office lasted from 1635 to 1663 and who also functioned as military bishop to the Bavarian army, the abbey managed to survive the calamities of the war. He is also responsible for instigating the abbey's economic recovery after 1648. The increasing economic and political importance under abbots Ernest Fabri, Maurus Falkner and Modest I led to the abbey being granted the status of an autonomous territorial Estate (Mediatstand) of Further Austria in 1701.

=== 1701–1806 — Rejuvenation of the abbey ===
This higher status acquired in 1701 brought about the overhaul of the abbey buildings, a process that began in 1714. Most buildings were erected in Late-Baroque style with the exception of the church, which was to become one of the main examples of Early-Neo-classicism in Southern Germany. The structures of the medieval abbey had been continuously enlarged and changed during the previous centuries with the originally church having been built in the style of Romanesque architecture.

When the Wiblingen Abbey achieved the status of a territorial Estate, an extensive plans for a rebuilding of the abbey, based on El Escorial in Spain, were made with the abbey church in its centre surrounded by a symmetrical quarters and courtyards. The plans were drafted by Baroque architect Christian Wiedemann. Works began with the building of the courtyards whose design was influenced by the plans for Einsiedeln Abbey by architect Caspar Moosbruger. However, in 1730 the original design was altered with as a consequence that the gate house and the church were not on one axis any longer. More changes to the original design were made: the originally planned central building was replaced by an elongated structure, probably influenced by the design of Weingarten Abbey and plans by Caspar Moosbruger.

Following Wiedemann's design, the famous library was built in the North wing of the abbey. At the time of completion in 1744, the works were already supervised by Christian Wiedemann's nephew Johann Wiedemann. In 1750, a new superintendent, Johann Michael Fischer, was appointed. He revised the original plans by Wiedemann. His main achievement is the new design for the East wing which was given a conspicuous risalit thereby emphasizing on the one hand the role of the chapter house as the centre of the monastic organisation and the fact that it was also the centre of a semi-sovereign territorial unit of power. The facade of this building was modelled on the Imperial Court Library in Vienna, which was chosen in order to demonstrate the abbey's attachment to the imperial house.

Fischer's contribution to the design of the abbey church are still controversial. The original drafts cannot be attributed to Fischer directly due their containing numerous errors and inaccuracies, which implies that the existing drafts were inspired by Fischer but not drawn by him. The sketches must have been drawn by one of his successors after Fischer's departure in 1757. It is possible that the sketches were made either by Johann Wiedemann or his son Dominikus Wiedemann who worked with Balthasar Neumann at Neresheim Abbey from where the drafts were later moved to the central archive of the Princes of Thurn und Taxis in Regensburg.

Due to financial strains the building of the church had not even started at the time of the death of Abbot Meinrad Hamberger (1730–1762). His successor, Modest II (1762–1768), either showed no interest in continuing the building works or was suffering from lack of revenue to complete them. Only during the term of Abbot Roman Fehr (1768–1798) the foundation of the church was laid. His superintendent was Johann Georg Specht, who had intimate knowledge of the erection of the church at the Abbey of St. Gall and of the Pilgrimage Church Birnau. He planned his building in Wiblingen according to these examples, which would have resulted in the church having a Late-Baroque appearance. However, he could not further his design since he was pushed aside by the fresco painter Januarius Zick, who had been educated to become an architect by Jakob Emele at Schussenried Abbey. Zick managed to finish the church in the so-called Greek-style, a term designating very early Neo-classicist buildings. He succeeded in doing so particularly in the interior where there is a balance between early Neo-classicism and a reminiscence of late Baroque. The facade remained incomplete even though the last abbot, Ulrich IV, tried in vain to have it finished during the Napoleonic Wars. The South wing remained unfinished too until 1917.

=== Secularisation ===
After Austria's defeat during the War of the Third Coalition in 1805, the abbey was first occupied by troops of the Grand Duchy of Baden and then by Bavarian troops. In 1806, the abbey became property of the newly founded Kingdom of Württemberg whereupon the Bavarian troops left after they had auctioned off all the remaining furniture. Wiblingen Abbey was one of the last monasteries to be dissolved during the mediatisation of ecclesiastical states and territories. The monks moved to Tyniec Abbey, now part of the Polish city of Kraków. Wiblingen Abbey became a residence for Duke Henry Heinrich, brother of Frederick I of Württemberg.

In the 1840s, the former abbey became part of the Federal Fortress Ulm and was used, since 1848, as infantry barracks. Only then, the convent building surrounding the abbey church was finished. Those buildings that had originally not been able to be completed were erected between 1915 and 1917 by using old drafts. Until the end of World War II, the former abbey was used as barracks. After the war the buildings housed refugees.

=== Today ===
Wiblingen is part of the Upper Swabian baroque Route. The abbey church and the abbey library in the North wing of the abbey are open to the public. Guided tours are available. The abbey museum, opened in 2006, is located in the former guest rooms of the convent.

The abbey church St. Martin is used as a Catholic parish church and was elevated to the status of basilica minor by Pope John Paul II in 1993.

The rest of the North wing and the adjoining former commercial buildings are now part of the University of Ulm, housing the School for Medical Documentation.

The South wing of the abbey, having been rebuilt in 1917, is part of the local network of municipal retirement homes.

== See also ==
- Roman Sebastian Zängerle
