= Leopold Treitel =

German Jewish classical scholar (1845-1931)

Leopold Jakob Jehuda Treitel (7 January 1845 – 4 March 1931) was a German Jewish classical scholar in the late 19th and early 20th century, and the last rabbi of the Jewish community in the town of Laupheim, then Württemberg, Southern Germany.

== Life ==
Leopold Treitel's father Joseph (originally Josephson) (1816 – 1886) was born in Wronke (now Wronki), in the Prussian province of Posen, and later moved to Breslau in the Prussian province of Silesia to become a leather merchant. In 1843, Joseph Treitel married Johanna Falk (1818 – 1874), daughter of the famous rabbi Jacob Jehuda Löbel Falk of Dyhernfurth. Jacob Jehuda Löbel Falk was a distinguished Talmud scholar, and later became dayan (religious judge) in Breslau. Together they had six children. Leopold, born in Breslau, was the eldest.

Leopold Treitel was born and grew up in Beslau. He began to learn Hebrew at a very young age. He attended Elisabet-Gymnasium in Breslau. His father had wanted him to join his commercial enterprise. However, due to Leopold Treitel's affinity and aptitude for learning, the headmaster of his school advised his father to let Leopold Treitel remain at school after the Mittlere Reife (GCSE) since he thought that Leopold Treitel would be more suited to become a scholar rather than a businessman. After taking his Abitur (GCE Advanced Level), he enrolled at the University of Breslau to study Classical Philology, Philosophy and History whilst also attending the Jewish Theological Seminary of Breslau. At the university and the seminary he studied under scholars such as Zacharias Frankel, one of the ideological fathers of present-day Conservative Judaism, Marcus Brann and Heinrich Graetz, the latter eventually supervising Treitel's PhD thesis on the language of Philo. Treitel obtained his PhD from the University of Breslau in December 1870, but continued his studies at the Jewish Theological Seminary of Breslau where, in 1876, he was ordained as a rabbi.

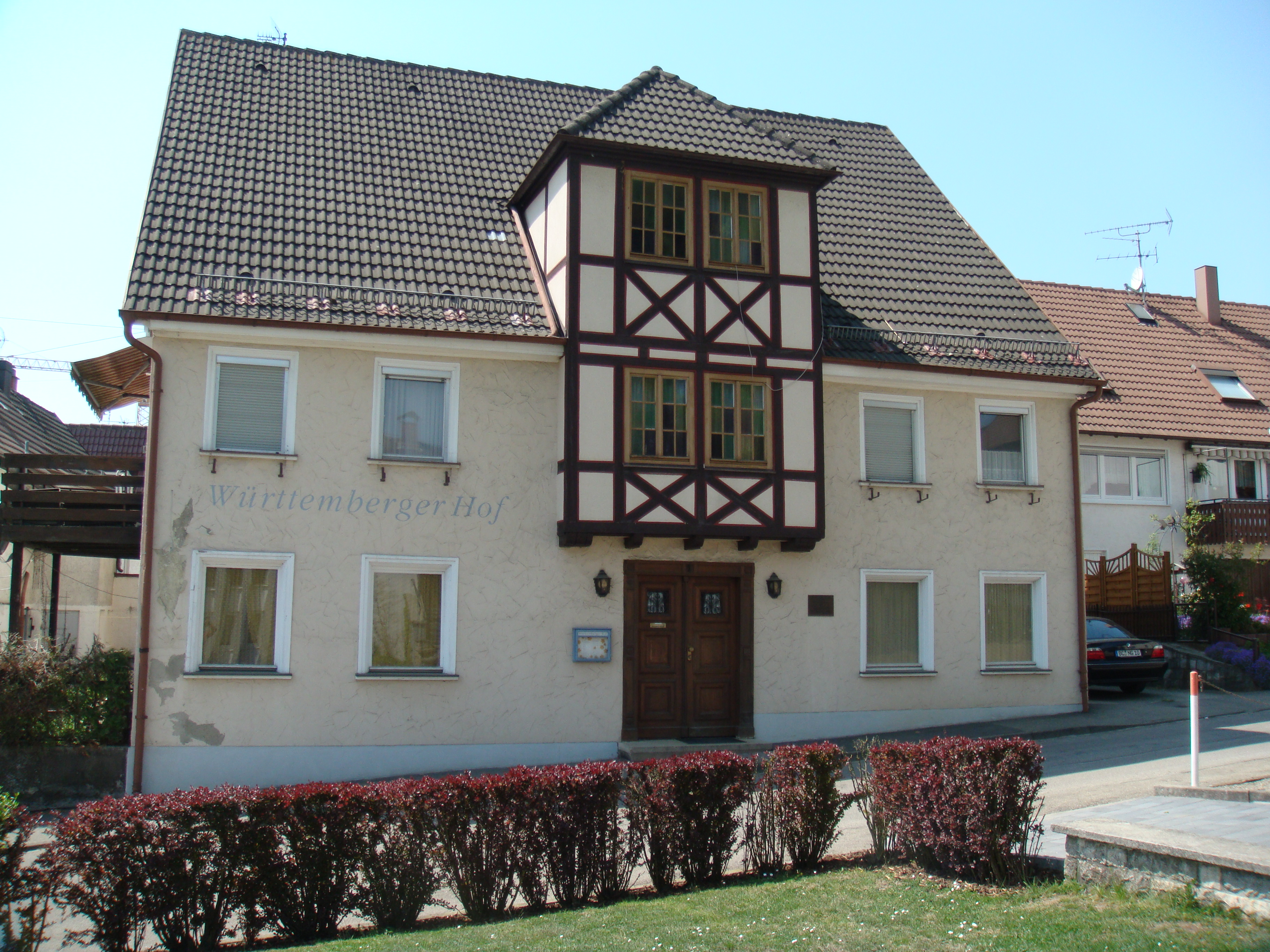
Former Rabbi's office in Laupheim

Following his ordination, Treitel worked as a rabbi in Koschmin in the Prussian province of Posen from 1878 until 1881 when he moved to Briesen in the Prussian province of West Prussia to become rabbi there, a function he fulfilled until 1884. In May 1882, he married Rebecca Brann from Schneidemühl, whose brother Marcus had also been a student at Breslau Jewish Theological Seminary. Together they had three children. In 1884, he became deputy town rabbi (2. Stadtrabbiner) in Karlsruhe in the Grand Duchy of Baden where he was also employed as teacher for religious education at state schools. He also functioned as director of the Jewish seminary for teacher training which was founded in 1886.

In 1895, Treitel moved to Laupheim to assume the office of District Rabbi in the small Upper Swabian town whose Jewish population at that time was about 500 strong, having been the largest Jewish community in the Kingdom of Württemberg in the middle of the 19th century. He was rabbi in Laupheim until retirement in 1922. No successor to Treitel as rabbi was appointed. As a consequence the office of district rabbi, established in 1832, ceased to exist on 1 April 1923. Leopold Treitel died on 4 March 1931 surrounded by his family, having suffered a stroke a few days earlier. He was interred at Laupheim Jewish Cemetery. When his wife Rebecca died in 1936, she was buried alongside him, a first on the cemetery where men and women had usually been buried separately.

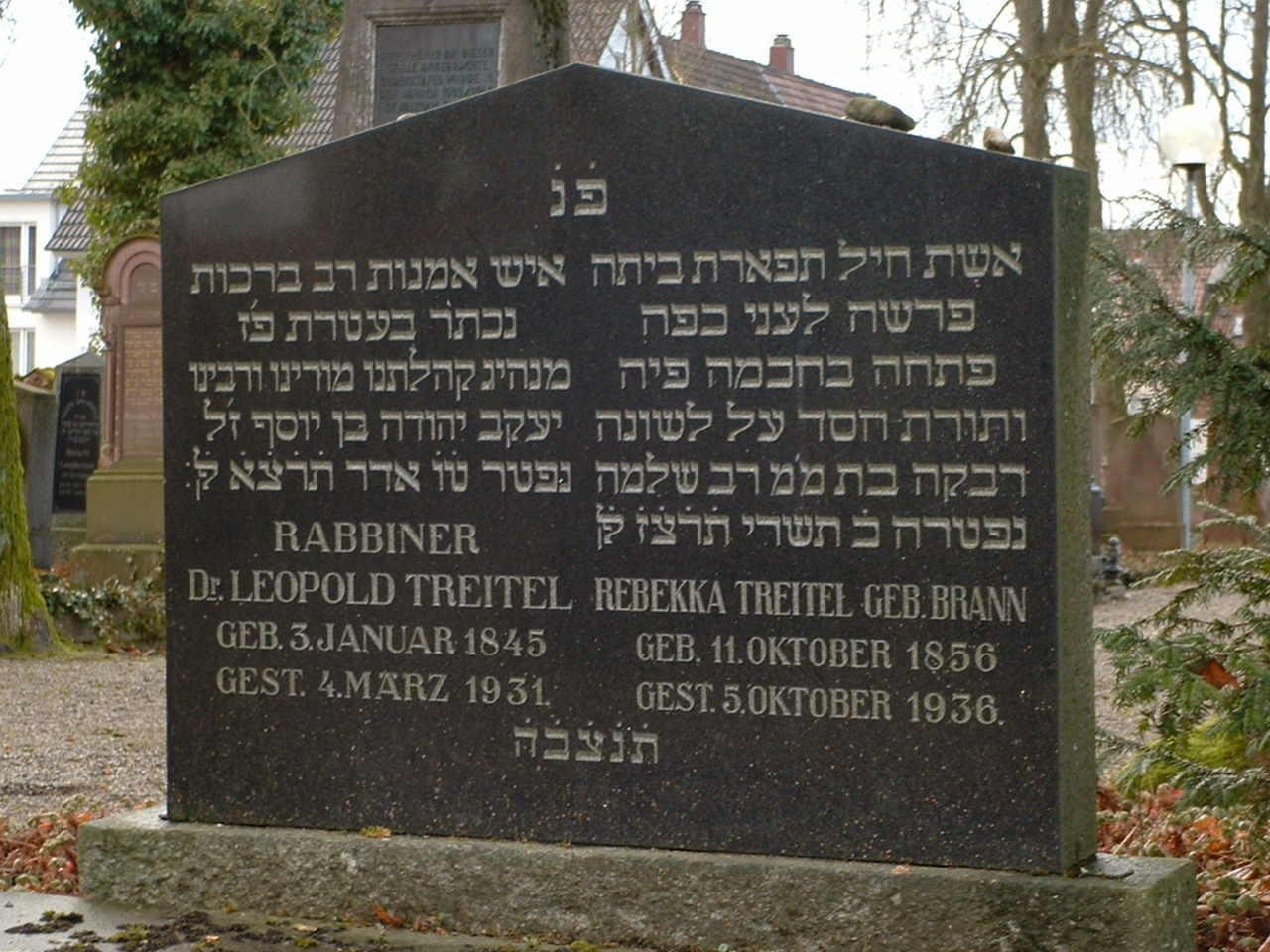
Gravestone of Leopold Treitel and his wife Rebekka

== Scholar ==
Treitel's main academic and scholarly interest revolved around the Hellenistic Jewish philosopher Philo of Alexandria ( c. 20 BCE – c. 50 CE). Starting in 1870 with his PhD thesis, De Philonis Judaei Sermone Dissertatio, written in Latin, he published a number of books and articles on Philo and his philosophy, culminating in his magnum opus Die gesamte Theologie und Philosophie Philos von Alexandria (The complete theology and philosophy of Philo of Alexandria), published in 1923. In the first century CE, Philo had attempted to merge Greek thinking and Judaism by using allegory. According to Treitel, Philo employed "rabbinic methods and patterns of interpretation, although Greek methodology did make a deep impact upon the content." Philo's works were rejected by contemporary Judaism. Influenced by Frankel and Graetz, Treitel attempted to demonstrate the importance of Philo's philosophy to Jewish thinking, particularly because of Philo's emphasis on the social order of Jewish life and the universal interpretation of the Jewish scriptures. Philo's appeal lay in the fact that he "did not imply an abrogation of the law, but rather to the contrary its wider dissemination and thus affirmation."

Treitel not only wrote on philosophical subjects. He was also interested in educative youth literature, and wrote a novel, Rahab, die Seherin von Jericho (Rahab, the Seeress of Jericho), whose aim it was to make religion and religious topics more accessible to young adults.

During his time as District Rabbi in Laupheim, Leopold Treitel became involved in local Jewish history. He made an inventory of the Laupheim Jewish cemetery by deciphering the inscriptions on the headstones and compiled a list of all persons buried in the graveyard until 1916. The original of this list was confiscated by the Reich Ancestry Office (Reichsstelle für Sippenforschung) after 1933, and put onto film between October 1944 and March 1945. The original list was consequently lost and presumed destroyed, but the film is now in the possession of the Baden-Württemberg Main State Archives in Stuttgart. A copy of this film was used by Nathanja Hüttenmeister for her documentation on the Laupheim Jewish cemetery.

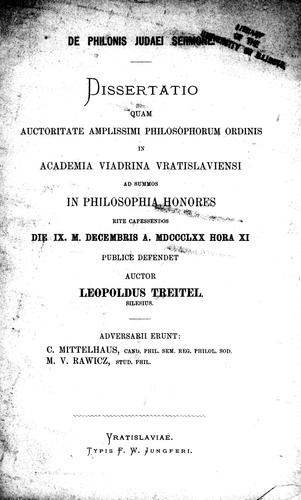
Cover of Treitel's PhD dissertation from 1870

== Selected publications ==
=== Books ===
- De Philonis Judaei Sermone Dissertatio (1870)
- Ghetto und Ghetto-Dichter: Vortrag, gehalten im Verein für jüdische Geschichte und Literatur in Karlsruhe in Baden (1891)
- Biblische Geschichte nach dem Worte der Bibel zum Gebrauche für Schulen und häußliche Belehrung neu bearbeitet (1895)
- Die Religions- und Kulturgeschichtliche Stellung Philos (1904)
- Rahab, die Seherin von Jericho (1909), novel
- Die alexandrinische Lehre von den Mittelwesen oder göttlichen Kräften, insbesondere bei Philo, geprüft auf die Frage, ob und welchen Einfluss sie auf das Mutterland Palästina gehabt hat (1912)
- Philonische Studien (1915)
- Die gesamte Theologie und Philosophie Philos von Alexandria (1923)
- Zur Entwicklungsgeschichte der Predigt in Synagoge und Kirche als des Beitrags, den das Judentum für allgemeine Kultur gestiftet hat (1929)

=== Articles ===
- "Exegetische Studien." in: Monatsschrift für Geschichte und Wissenschaft des Judentums 27 (1878), vol. 10, p. 478–480
- "Recension: Allgemeines, vollständiges Neuhebräisch-deutsches Wörterbuch von Moses Schulbaum." in: Monatsschrift für Geschichte und Wissenschaft des Judentums 30 (1881), vol. 9, p. 428–432
- "Kritische und exegetische Analecten zu den Proverbien." in: Monatsschrift für Geschichte und Wissenschaft des Judentums 31 (1882), vol. 9, p. 423–426
- "Zur Duell-Frage. Ein Wort an Eltern und Erzieher." in: Israelitische Wochenschrift für die religiösen und socialen Interessen des Judentums, 1890
- "Ghetto und Ghetto-Dichter: Vortrag, gehalten im Verein für jüdische Geschichte und Literatur in Karlsruhe in Baden." in: Jahrbuch zur Belehrung und Unterhaltung, Breslau, 1892
- "Die Septuaginta zu Hosea." in: Monatsschrift für Geschichte und Wissenschaft des Judentums 41 (1897), vol. 10, p. 433–454
- "Zur Geschichte des israelitischen Schulwesens in Württemberg." in: Mitteilungen der Gesellschaft für deutsche Erziehungs- und Schulgeschichte 9 (1899), p. 51–65
- "Z. Frankel's Verdienste um die Septuagintaforschung." in: Monatsschrift für Geschichte und Wissenschaft des Judentums 45 (1901), vol. 3, p. 253–262
- "Der Nomos, insonderheit Sabbath und Feste in philonischer Beleuchtung an der Hand von Philos Schrift De Septenario." in: Monatsschrift für Geschichte und Wissenschaft des Judentums 47 (1903), p. 214–231, 317–321, 399–417, 490–514.
- "Agada bei Philo." in: Monatsschrift für Geschichte und Wissenschaft des Judentums 53 (1909), vol. 1, p. 28–45, 159–173, 286–291.
- "Ursprung, Begriff und Umfang der allegorischen Schrifterklärung." in: Monatsschrift für Geschichte und Wissenschaft des Judentums 55 (1911), vol. 5, p. 543–554
- Sprachliches und Exegetisches. Der historische Gang der hebrâischen Sprache. in: Festschrift zum 70. Geburtstage des Oberkirchenrats Dr. Kroner, Stuttgart, Württembergischer Rabbiner-Verein (ed.), Breslau, 1917, p. 1–26
- "Flavius Josephus bei H. Graetz." in: Monatsschrift für Geschichte und Wissenschaft des Judentums 61 (1917), vol. 4, p. 385–391
- "Grenzfragen zwischen Philosophie und Geschichte." in: Monatsschrift für Geschichte und Wissenschaft des Judentums 63 (1919), vol. 2, p. 108–112
- "Wert und Bedeutung der Septuaginta zu den 12 kleinen Propheten." in: Monatsschrift für Geschichte und Wissenschaft des Judentums 73 (1929), vol. 5, p. 232–234
- "Zur Entwicklungsgeschichte der Predigt in Synagoge und Kirche als des Beitrags, den das Judentum für allgemeine Kultur gestiftet hat." In: Festschrift zum 75 jährigen Bestehen des Jüdisch-theologischen Seminars, vol. 2, Breslau, 1929, p. 373–376

== See also ==
- History of the Jews in Laupheim
- History of the Jews in Germany
- Jewish philosophy
