= Siegfried Einstein =

German-Jewish poet and essayist

- Born: 30 November 1919; Laupheim, Germany
- Died: 25 April 1983 (aged 63); Mannheim, Germany
- Occupation: Writer
- Spouse: Ilonka Sand
- Writing career
- Genres: Poetry, novels, essays, journalism
- Notable work: Wer wird in diesem Jahr den Schofar blasen? (1987)
- Notable awards: Thomas Mann-Förderpreis (1956)

Siegfried Einstein (30 November 1919 – 25 April 1983) was a German-Jewish poet, novelist, essayist and journalist.

== Life ==
The son of department store owner Max D. Einstein, Siegfried Einstein was born in the small city of Laupheim in Württemberg. His father was the owner of the city's largest department store. The Einsteins had been residents in Laupheim since the second half of the 18th century.

On 1 April 1933, the recently elected Nazis organized a one-day boycott of all Jewish-owned businesses in Germany. The department store Einstein was one of the Jewish businesses in Laupheim picketed by local members of the SA. During this action the shop windows were deliberately smashed.

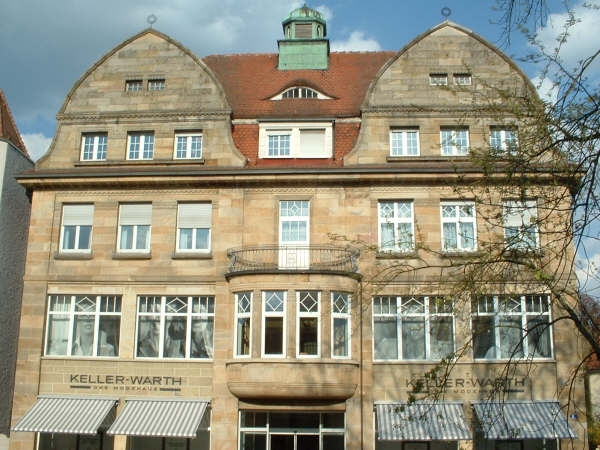
Former department store Einstein in Laupheim

Whilst hiking in the mountains in August 1933, Einstein's twenty-year-old sister Clärle was killed by lightning in front of his eyes. For the rest of his life he kept the iron tip of her ice axe as a memento.

During antisemitic actions in Laupheim in 1934, Siegfried Einstein was chased across the school yard and injured by being pelted with stones whereupon, on 26 September 1934, he fled to Switzerland and settled in the municipality of Au in the Canton of St. Gallen. There he went to boarding school. In November 1938, following the so-called Reichskristallnacht, his father was arrested and sent to the concentration camp Dachau. While being held at Dachau concentration camp, he was deprived of his department store following the programme of Aryanization. Einstein's father was subsequently released from the concentration camp, physically and mentally a broken man. In 1940, both his parents managed to emigrate to Switzerland, their German nationality having been taken away, thus rendering them stateless. Siegfried Einstein had already been deprived of German nationality.

Between 24 February 1941 and 25 June 1945, Siegfried Einstein, being a stateless foreigner, was interned by the Swiss government in nine labour camps and forced to work in road construction, draining swamps and as a clerical assistant. During this period, he managed to contact German resistance groups and learnt about German literature produced by exiled authors. Following his release in 1945 his first works were published.

In 1949, during his first visit to Germany since his emigration, Siegfried Einstein met Erich Kästner.

From 1950 until 1952, he headed the Pflug Verlag in Thal near St. Gallen in Switzerland.

In 1953 he returned to Germany and settled in the Hessian town of Lampertheim. However, following antisemitic riots directed against him, exhaustingly reported in the media, he moved to Mannheim in 1959.

In 1956, the Thomas-Mann-Society awarded him the Thomas-Mann-Förderpreis. In the same year he held the speech during the commemorations of the centenary of Heinrich Heine's death at Montmartre Cemetery. His speech was subsequently published in Les Lettres Francaises.

Between 1957 and 1967 he collaborated with several socialist and satirical newspapers and magazines amongst which were the Andere Zeitung, Deutscher Michel and Simplicissimus. He was also a regular contributor to several radio stations.

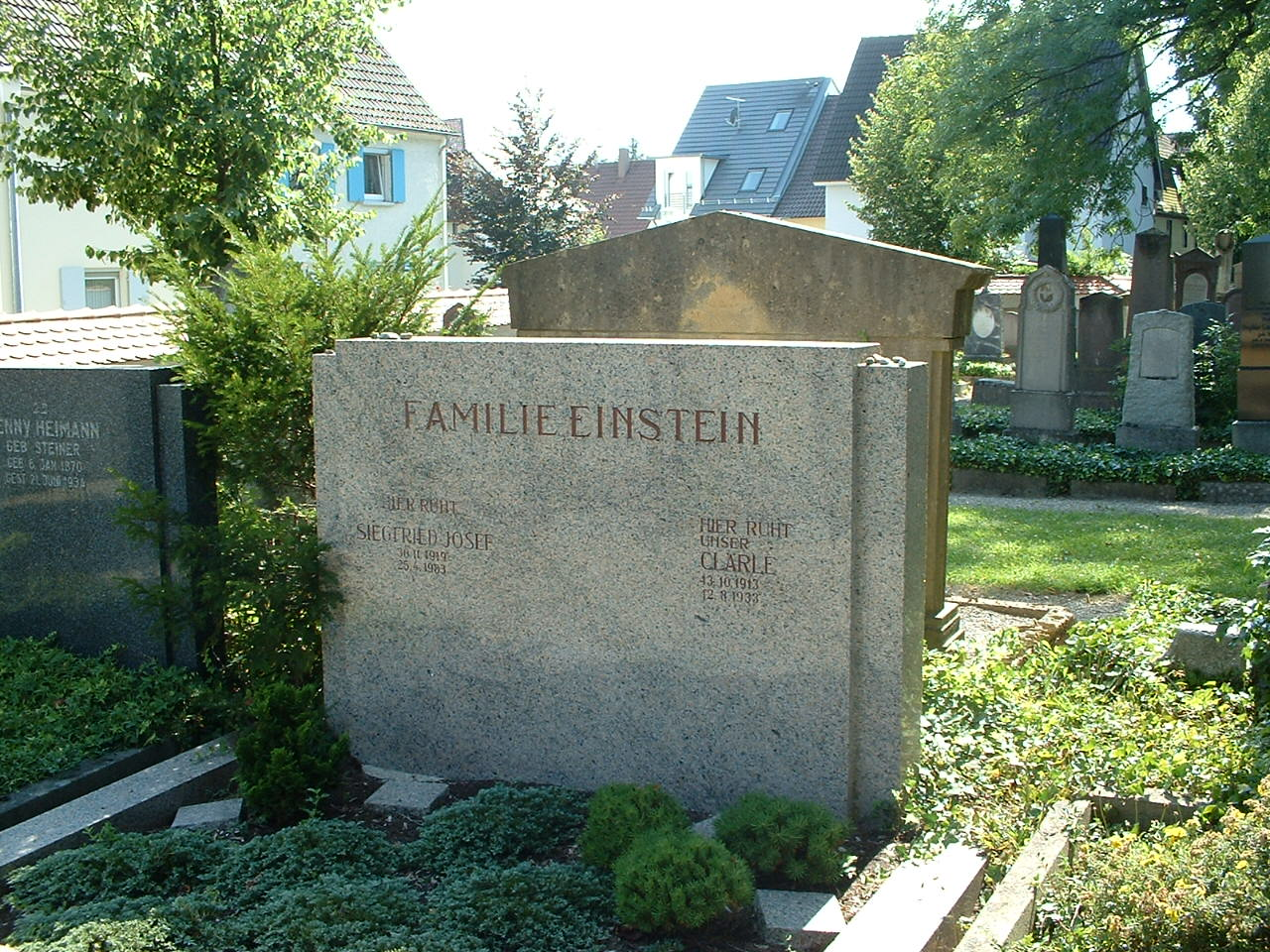
Siegfried Einstein's grave in Laupheim

In 1961, influenced by the trial of Adolf Eichmann, he published "Eichmann. Death's Head accountant" (Eichmann. Chefbuchhalter des Todes), a documentary about Nazi culprits and new antisemitic tendencies within Germany. For this book he was awarded the prestigious Tucholsky-Prize.

In 1962 he travelled to Moscow, where he met Ilya Ehrenburg, Konstantin Fedin, Yevgenia Ginzburg and Lev Kopelev. Based on his experience during this journey, he wrote "Unforgettable days in Leningrad – Tashkent and Samarkand" (Unvergessliche Tage in Leningrad – Taschkent und Samarkand).

In 1967 he married Ilona Sand.

From 1954 onwards he worked as a lecturer for literature at the adult education centre in Mannheim. He also gave lectures and held speeches in Germany as well as abroad. His poems were published in several anthologies.

He died suddenly of a heart attack in Mannheim and was buried next to his sister, Clärle, in the Jewish cemetery in Laupheim.

In January 2020 a commemorative plaque was unveiled at Siegfried Einstein’s birth place in Laupheim in remembrance of the Jewish history of the department store and to mark the place of his birth.

== Awards ==
- 1956 Thomas Mann-Förderpreis
- 1964 Tucholsky-Prize of the city of Kiel

== Selected works ==
- Melodien in Dur und Moll, 1946 – poems.
- Die Frau eines Andern oder Der Mann unter dem Bett, 1947 – translation of Fyodor Dostoevsky's Cuzaja zena i muz pod krovat'ju.
- Sirda, 1948 – novel.
- Das Schilfbuch, 1949 – novel.
- Thomas und Angelina, 1949 – novel.
- Das Wolkenschiff, 1950 – poems.
- Legenden, 1951 – novel.
- Eichmann: Chefbuchhalter des Todes, 1961 – documentary.
- Die Geschichte vom Goldfisch, 1961 – translation of Roger Mauge's Histoire d'un poisson rouge.
- Meine Liebe ist erblindet, 1984 – poems, posthumously published.
- Wer wird in diesem Jahr den Schofar blasen?, 1987 – essays, poems and speeches, posthumously published.

== See also ==
- German Literature
- History of the Jews in Laupheim
- Laupheim
