= Kilian von Steiner =

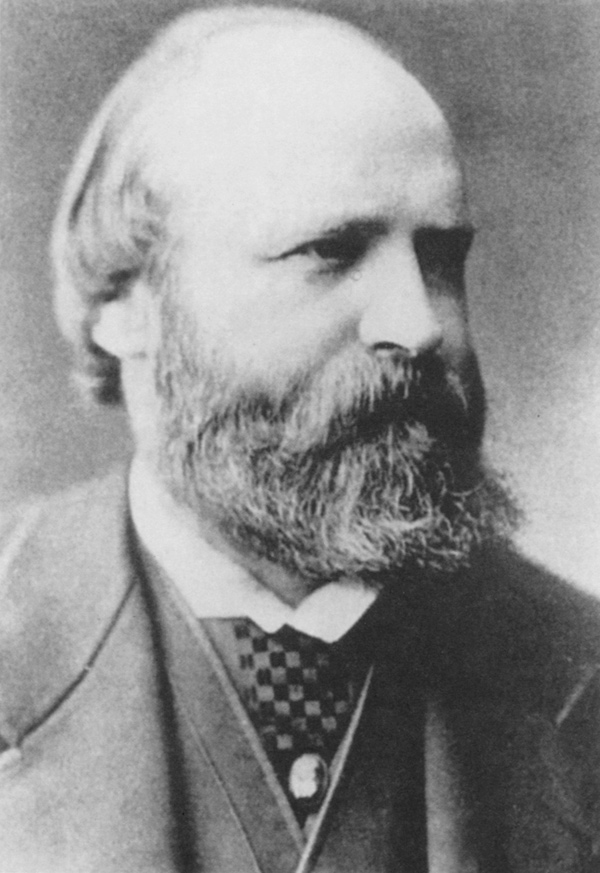
- Kilian von Steiner, ca. 1880
- Born: Kilian Steiner; October 9, 1833; Laupheim
- Died: September 25, 1903 (aged 69); Stuttgart
- Occupations: Banker, Industrialist

Kilian von Steiner (German: [ˈkiːli̯aːn fɔn ˈʃtaɪnɐ]; 9 October 1833 – 25 September 1903) was a German banker and industrialist.

== Life and career ==
Born in Laupheim as the eighth child of Jewish merchant Viktor Steiner and his wife Sophie, Kilian Steiner spent his youth in the small Upper Swabian town. The family on his father's side had been residents in Laupheim since approximately 1750.

He attended secondary school in Ulm and Stuttgart, after which he went on to go to university to study history, philosophy and law at the universities of Tübingen and Heidelberg. After graduating in 1859, he settled as a solicitor in Heilbronn where he met and became a lifelong friend of economist Gustav Schmoller.

Together with political friends, one of whom was Gustav Siegle, Steiner was one of the founding members of the National Liberal Party in 1865, a party committed to the so-called Kleindeutsche Lösung (Lesser German Solution) and to the unifying policy of Otto von Bismarck.

Steiner was among the most prominent members of economic life in 19th-century Germany. He was involved in the founding of several banks inside and outside of the Kingdom of Württemberg. In 1869 he was one of the co-founders of the Württembergische Vereinsbank, one of the forerunners of the Deutsche Bank. He was also one of the founders of BASF in 1873, WMF in Geislingen an der Steige in 1880 and the Daimler Motoren Gesellschaft in Untertürkheim in 1890. During this period, Kilian Steiner was also instrumental in the foundation of several lesser well-known industrial ventures.

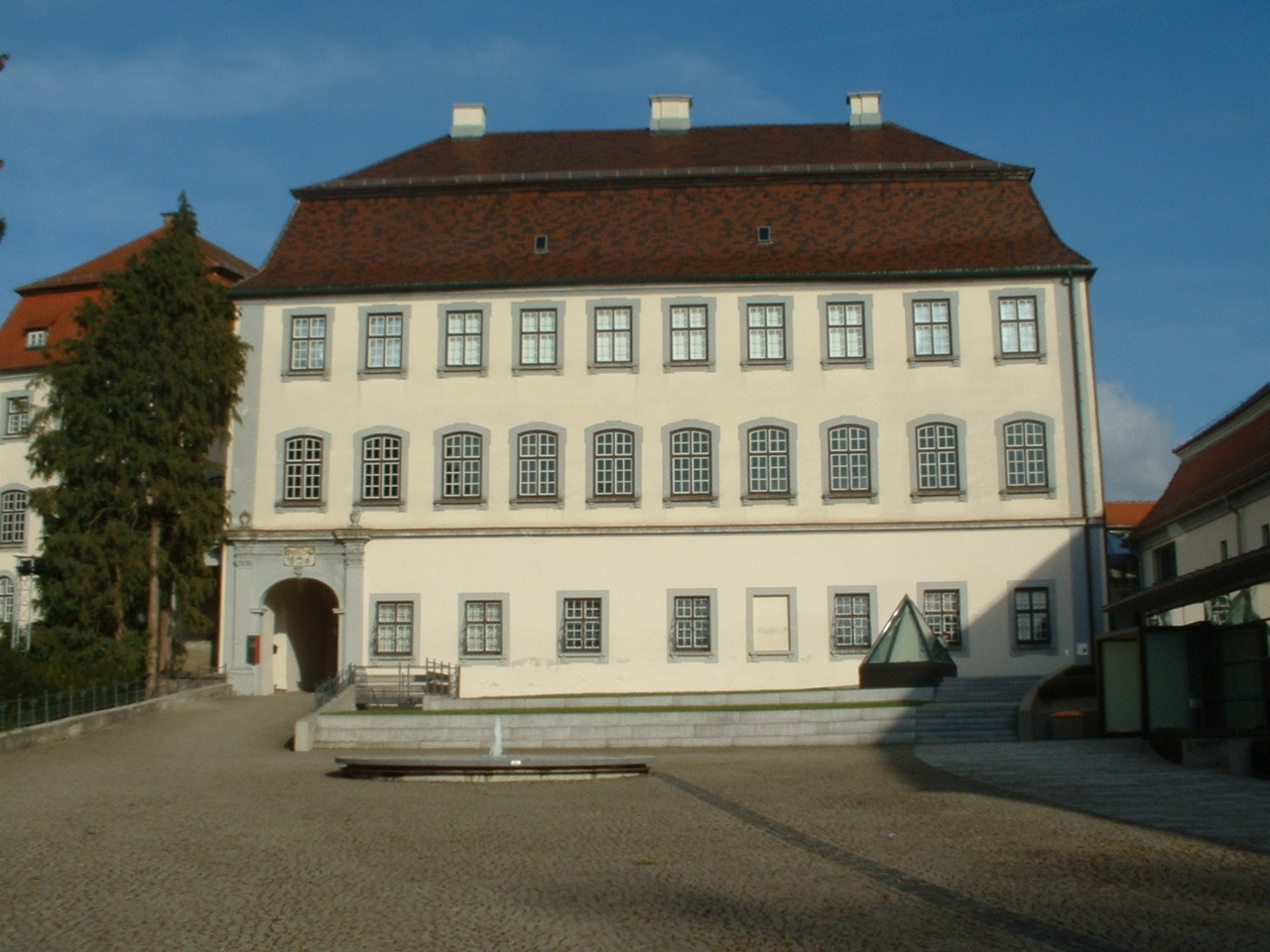
Großlaupheim Castle

In 1876 Kilian von Steiner was awarded a doctorate in law. Steiner was also a prominent patron of the arts and, through his efforts and financial contributions, ensured the founding of the Schiller National Museum in Marbach and the Swabian Schiller Federation in 1890.

In 1891, Steiner became honorary citizen of Bad Niedernau.

He bought Großlaupheim Castle together with all its lands from his siblings in 1894 and had the castle's interior modernised with all the conveniences of the time so that it could be inhabited. The castle became a focal point for meetings with his friends from the spheres of literature, economics and the arts.

By receiving the Order of the Crown from king William II of Württemberg in 1895 Steiner was ennobled. Shortly afterwards he retired from public life.

Kilian von Steiner died in Stuttgart in 1903.

In 1987 a bust of Kilian von Steiner was unveiled in the rose garden at Castle Großlaupheim. In the same year the local vocational school was named after Kilian von Steiner.

A special room dedicated to Kilian von Steiner was opened in the Museum of the History of Christians and Jews in Laupheim in 1998.

== See also ==
- History of the Jews in Laupheim
