= Moses Schulbaum =

Galician Jewish Hebrew writer and translator (died 1918)

- משה בן ישעיהו שולבוים
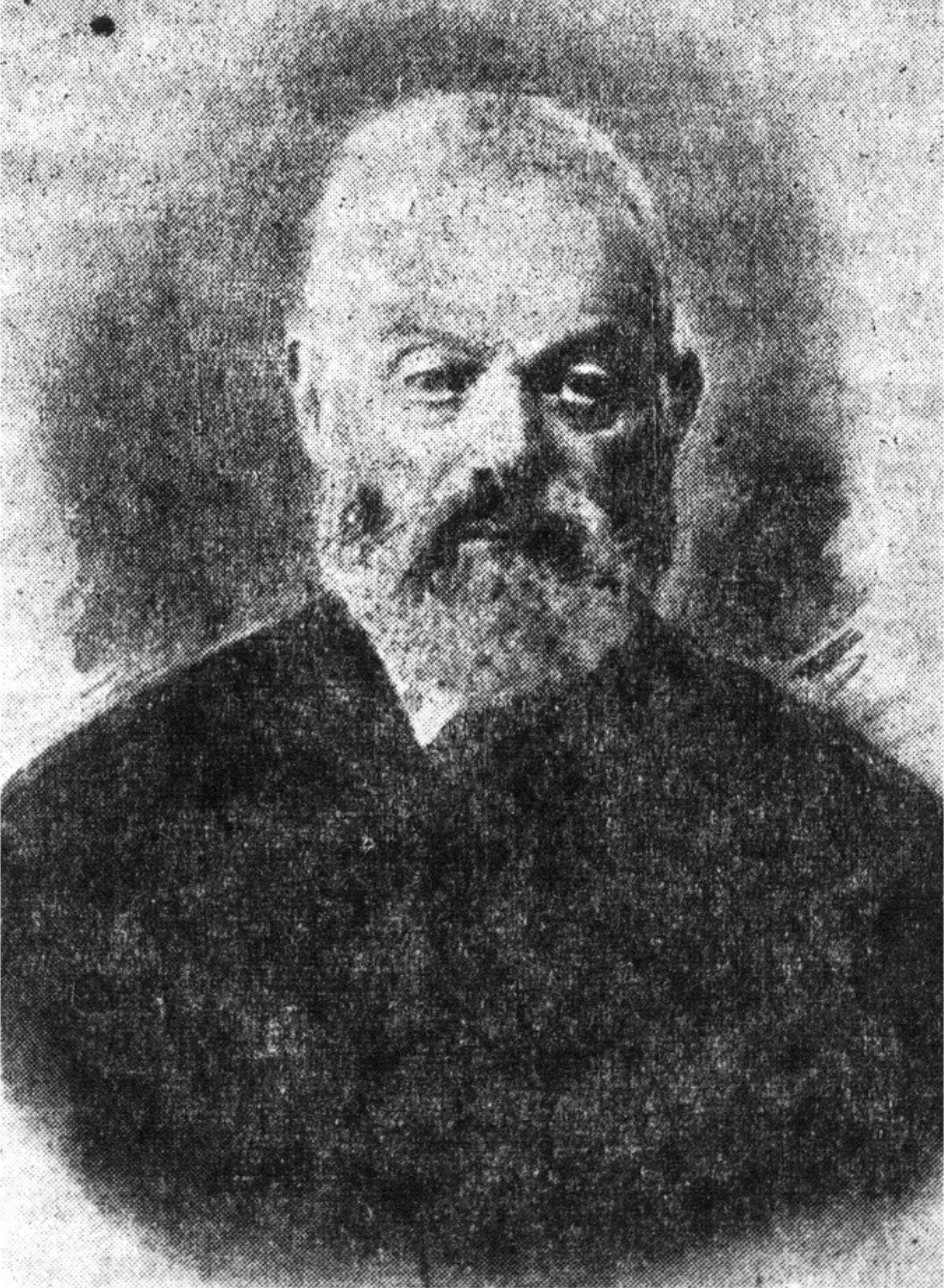
- Born: c. 1833; Jezierzany, Galicia
- Died: April 4, 1918; Vienna, Austria-Hungary
- Writing career
- Language: Hebrew

Moses Schulbaum (Hebrew: משה בן ישעיהו שולבוים; c. 1833 – 4 April 1918) was a Galician Jewish Hebrew writer, translator, and lexicographer.

== Biography ==
Moshe Schulbaum was born in April 1830, 1833, or 1835 in Eastern Galicia to Yeshayahu and Devorah Schulbaum. His father was a wealthy merchant, and his mother a descendant of the Chacham Tzvi. At an early age he devoted himself to the study of Hebrew, and in 1870 entered the printing-house of Michael Wolf at Lemberg as proofreader. When the Baron de Hirsch schools were founded in Galicia, Schulbaum was called (1889) as teacher of Hebrew to Kolomea; in 1897 he was transferred to the Baron de Hirsch school at Mikulince.

Schulbaum's library burned in the chaos of World War I, and his house was requisitioned by the Russian military. He fled with his family to Vienna, where he died in 1918.

== Work ==
Schulbaum translated into Hebrew Schiller's Die Räuber (Lemberg, 1871) and Aristotle's Nicomachean Ethics (Lemberg, 1877); and edited a complete revision of Judah Leib Ben-Ze'ev's Otzar ha-shorashim (5 vols., Lemberg, 1880–82). The last four volumes of this book—namely, the Aramaic, modern Hebrew, and German-Hebrew glossaries, and the glossary of proper names—were compiled independently by Schulbaum; likewise the following parts which appeared in a second edition: Hebrew-German dictionary (Lemberg, 1898), and German-Hebrew dictionary (Lemberg, 1904). Schulbaum was opposed to the introduction of new Hebrew words from Arabic, and instead urged the translation of Aramaic phrases into Hebrew.
